

586001–586100 

|-bgcolor=#fefefe
| 586001 ||  || — || November 20, 2004 || Kitt Peak || Spacewatch ||  || align=right data-sort-value="0.55" | 550 m || 
|-id=002 bgcolor=#fefefe
| 586002 ||  || — || November 3, 2004 || Kitt Peak || Spacewatch ||  || align=right data-sort-value="0.60" | 600 m || 
|-id=003 bgcolor=#d6d6d6
| 586003 ||  || — || September 28, 2016 || Piszkesteto || A. Sodor ||  || align=right | 2.2 km || 
|-id=004 bgcolor=#d6d6d6
| 586004 ||  || — || September 24, 2011 || Haleakala || Pan-STARRS ||  || align=right | 2.0 km || 
|-id=005 bgcolor=#E9E9E9
| 586005 ||  || — || April 14, 2016 || Haleakala || Pan-STARRS ||  || align=right data-sort-value="0.94" | 940 m || 
|-id=006 bgcolor=#fefefe
| 586006 ||  || — || January 28, 2007 || Mount Lemmon || Mount Lemmon Survey || H || align=right data-sort-value="0.46" | 460 m || 
|-id=007 bgcolor=#d6d6d6
| 586007 ||  || — || February 22, 2014 || Mount Lemmon || Mount Lemmon Survey ||  || align=right | 2.1 km || 
|-id=008 bgcolor=#d6d6d6
| 586008 ||  || — || September 5, 2000 || Apache Point || SDSS Collaboration ||  || align=right | 2.4 km || 
|-id=009 bgcolor=#FA8072
| 586009 ||  || — || September 24, 2000 || Socorro || LINEAR ||  || align=right data-sort-value="0.48" | 480 m || 
|-id=010 bgcolor=#E9E9E9
| 586010 ||  || — || September 26, 2000 || Socorro || LINEAR ||  || align=right | 1.5 km || 
|-id=011 bgcolor=#E9E9E9
| 586011 ||  || — || September 24, 2000 || Kitt Peak || Spacewatch ||  || align=right | 1.2 km || 
|-id=012 bgcolor=#d6d6d6
| 586012 ||  || — || September 1, 2005 || Kitt Peak || Spacewatch ||  || align=right | 2.5 km || 
|-id=013 bgcolor=#d6d6d6
| 586013 ||  || — || April 4, 2003 || Kitt Peak || Spacewatch ||  || align=right | 2.5 km || 
|-id=014 bgcolor=#E9E9E9
| 586014 ||  || — || August 23, 2004 || Kitt Peak || Spacewatch ||  || align=right | 1.1 km || 
|-id=015 bgcolor=#E9E9E9
| 586015 ||  || — || April 25, 2015 || Haleakala || Pan-STARRS ||  || align=right | 1.5 km || 
|-id=016 bgcolor=#d6d6d6
| 586016 ||  || — || August 26, 2005 || Palomar || NEAT ||  || align=right | 2.2 km || 
|-id=017 bgcolor=#d6d6d6
| 586017 ||  || — || February 26, 2014 || Haleakala || Pan-STARRS ||  || align=right | 2.3 km || 
|-id=018 bgcolor=#E9E9E9
| 586018 ||  || — || November 9, 2013 || Kitt Peak || Spacewatch ||  || align=right | 1.2 km || 
|-id=019 bgcolor=#d6d6d6
| 586019 ||  || — || September 13, 2016 || Mount Lemmon || Mount Lemmon Survey ||  || align=right | 2.1 km || 
|-id=020 bgcolor=#d6d6d6
| 586020 ||  || — || August 30, 2005 || Kitt Peak || Spacewatch ||  || align=right | 2.7 km || 
|-id=021 bgcolor=#E9E9E9
| 586021 ||  || — || November 10, 2009 || Kitt Peak || Spacewatch ||  || align=right | 2.1 km || 
|-id=022 bgcolor=#E9E9E9
| 586022 ||  || — || September 26, 2000 || Kitt Peak || Spacewatch ||  || align=right | 1.0 km || 
|-id=023 bgcolor=#E9E9E9
| 586023 ||  || — || September 25, 2017 || Haleakala || Pan-STARRS ||  || align=right data-sort-value="0.66" | 660 m || 
|-id=024 bgcolor=#d6d6d6
| 586024 ||  || — || August 8, 2005 || Cerro Tololo || Cerro Tololo Obs. ||  || align=right | 2.2 km || 
|-id=025 bgcolor=#E9E9E9
| 586025 ||  || — || March 28, 2015 || Haleakala || Pan-STARRS ||  || align=right data-sort-value="0.95" | 950 m || 
|-id=026 bgcolor=#d6d6d6
| 586026 ||  || — || February 9, 2008 || Mount Lemmon || Mount Lemmon Survey ||  || align=right | 2.5 km || 
|-id=027 bgcolor=#d6d6d6
| 586027 ||  || — || October 1, 2000 || Socorro || LINEAR ||  || align=right | 3.0 km || 
|-id=028 bgcolor=#E9E9E9
| 586028 ||  || — || September 20, 2000 || Kitt Peak || Spacewatch ||  || align=right | 1.4 km || 
|-id=029 bgcolor=#E9E9E9
| 586029 ||  || — || October 1, 2000 || Socorro || LINEAR ||  || align=right | 1.6 km || 
|-id=030 bgcolor=#E9E9E9
| 586030 ||  || — || October 1, 2000 || Socorro || LINEAR ||  || align=right | 1.4 km || 
|-id=031 bgcolor=#fefefe
| 586031 ||  || — || September 26, 2000 || Haleakala || AMOS ||  || align=right data-sort-value="0.88" | 880 m || 
|-id=032 bgcolor=#d6d6d6
| 586032 ||  || — || October 6, 2000 || Kitt Peak || Spacewatch ||  || align=right | 2.1 km || 
|-id=033 bgcolor=#E9E9E9
| 586033 ||  || — || October 7, 2000 || Kitt Peak || Spacewatch ||  || align=right | 1.4 km || 
|-id=034 bgcolor=#d6d6d6
| 586034 ||  || — || August 27, 2005 || Palomar || NEAT ||  || align=right | 2.3 km || 
|-id=035 bgcolor=#E9E9E9
| 586035 ||  || — || February 12, 2002 || Palomar || NEAT ||  || align=right data-sort-value="0.93" | 930 m || 
|-id=036 bgcolor=#d6d6d6
| 586036 ||  || — || May 4, 2014 || Haleakala || Pan-STARRS ||  || align=right | 2.2 km || 
|-id=037 bgcolor=#d6d6d6
| 586037 ||  || — || February 13, 2008 || Mount Lemmon || Mount Lemmon Survey ||  || align=right | 2.2 km || 
|-id=038 bgcolor=#E9E9E9
| 586038 ||  || — || April 3, 2011 || Haleakala || Pan-STARRS ||  || align=right data-sort-value="0.85" | 850 m || 
|-id=039 bgcolor=#E9E9E9
| 586039 ||  || — || October 1, 2000 || Kitt Peak || Spacewatch ||  || align=right | 1.5 km || 
|-id=040 bgcolor=#d6d6d6
| 586040 ||  || — || September 1, 2005 || Kitt Peak || Spacewatch ||  || align=right | 2.3 km || 
|-id=041 bgcolor=#E9E9E9
| 586041 ||  || — || November 1, 2000 || Kitt Peak || Spacewatch ||  || align=right | 1.7 km || 
|-id=042 bgcolor=#E9E9E9
| 586042 ||  || — || November 1, 2000 || Kitt Peak || Spacewatch ||  || align=right data-sort-value="0.86" | 860 m || 
|-id=043 bgcolor=#fefefe
| 586043 ||  || — || September 9, 2007 || Mount Lemmon || Mount Lemmon Survey ||  || align=right data-sort-value="0.59" | 590 m || 
|-id=044 bgcolor=#E9E9E9
| 586044 ||  || — || November 27, 2000 || Kitt Peak || Spacewatch ||  || align=right data-sort-value="0.95" | 950 m || 
|-id=045 bgcolor=#d6d6d6
| 586045 ||  || — || April 1, 2003 || Apache Point || SDSS Collaboration ||  || align=right | 2.8 km || 
|-id=046 bgcolor=#E9E9E9
| 586046 ||  || — || June 29, 2008 || Siding Spring || SSS ||  || align=right | 1.8 km || 
|-id=047 bgcolor=#E9E9E9
| 586047 ||  || — || March 28, 2011 || Kitt Peak || Spacewatch ||  || align=right | 1.4 km || 
|-id=048 bgcolor=#E9E9E9
| 586048 ||  || — || April 10, 2003 || Kitt Peak || Spacewatch ||  || align=right | 1.1 km || 
|-id=049 bgcolor=#d6d6d6
| 586049 ||  || — || February 13, 2002 || Apache Point || SDSS Collaboration ||  || align=right | 2.4 km || 
|-id=050 bgcolor=#E9E9E9
| 586050 ||  || — || June 25, 2004 || Kitt Peak || Spacewatch ||  || align=right data-sort-value="0.97" | 970 m || 
|-id=051 bgcolor=#E9E9E9
| 586051 ||  || — || November 28, 2013 || Mount Lemmon || Mount Lemmon Survey ||  || align=right | 1.2 km || 
|-id=052 bgcolor=#E9E9E9
| 586052 ||  || — || November 16, 2000 || Kitt Peak || Spacewatch ||  || align=right | 1.2 km || 
|-id=053 bgcolor=#E9E9E9
| 586053 ||  || — || October 20, 2004 || Catalina || CSS ||  || align=right data-sort-value="0.98" | 980 m || 
|-id=054 bgcolor=#d6d6d6
| 586054 ||  || — || April 1, 2008 || Kitt Peak || Spacewatch ||  || align=right | 2.2 km || 
|-id=055 bgcolor=#E9E9E9
| 586055 ||  || — || November 27, 2017 || Mount Lemmon || Mount Lemmon Survey ||  || align=right | 1.7 km || 
|-id=056 bgcolor=#fefefe
| 586056 ||  || — || October 7, 2007 || Mount Lemmon || Mount Lemmon Survey ||  || align=right data-sort-value="0.53" | 530 m || 
|-id=057 bgcolor=#E9E9E9
| 586057 ||  || — || December 1, 2000 || Kitt Peak || Spacewatch ||  || align=right | 1.6 km || 
|-id=058 bgcolor=#fefefe
| 586058 ||  || — || October 12, 2007 || Mount Lemmon || Mount Lemmon Survey ||  || align=right data-sort-value="0.89" | 890 m || 
|-id=059 bgcolor=#d6d6d6
| 586059 ||  || — || December 30, 2000 || Kitt Peak || Spacewatch ||  || align=right | 2.6 km || 
|-id=060 bgcolor=#d6d6d6
| 586060 ||  || — || April 6, 2008 || Mount Lemmon || Mount Lemmon Survey ||  || align=right | 2.7 km || 
|-id=061 bgcolor=#d6d6d6
| 586061 ||  || — || December 21, 2000 || Kitt Peak || Spacewatch ||  || align=right | 3.9 km || 
|-id=062 bgcolor=#E9E9E9
| 586062 ||  || — || December 11, 2013 || Haleakala || Pan-STARRS ||  || align=right | 1.3 km || 
|-id=063 bgcolor=#E9E9E9
| 586063 ||  || — || December 14, 2013 || Mount Lemmon || Mount Lemmon Survey ||  || align=right | 1.4 km || 
|-id=064 bgcolor=#E9E9E9
| 586064 ||  || — || March 29, 2015 || Haleakala || Pan-STARRS ||  || align=right | 1.4 km || 
|-id=065 bgcolor=#d6d6d6
| 586065 ||  || — || July 12, 2015 || Haleakala || Pan-STARRS ||  || align=right | 3.0 km || 
|-id=066 bgcolor=#fefefe
| 586066 ||  || — || October 26, 2011 || Haleakala || Pan-STARRS ||  || align=right data-sort-value="0.71" | 710 m || 
|-id=067 bgcolor=#d6d6d6
| 586067 ||  || — || November 6, 2010 || Catalina || CSS ||  || align=right | 2.7 km || 
|-id=068 bgcolor=#d6d6d6
| 586068 ||  || — || November 6, 2005 || Kitt Peak || Spacewatch ||  || align=right | 2.5 km || 
|-id=069 bgcolor=#fefefe
| 586069 ||  || — || October 28, 2010 || Mount Lemmon || Mount Lemmon Survey ||  || align=right data-sort-value="0.76" | 760 m || 
|-id=070 bgcolor=#E9E9E9
| 586070 ||  || — || January 21, 2015 || Haleakala || Pan-STARRS ||  || align=right | 1.6 km || 
|-id=071 bgcolor=#C2FFFF
| 586071 ||  || — || December 1, 2010 || Mount Lemmon || Mount Lemmon Survey || L4 || align=right | 8.7 km || 
|-id=072 bgcolor=#d6d6d6
| 586072 ||  || — || January 20, 2018 || Haleakala || Pan-STARRS ||  || align=right | 2.8 km || 
|-id=073 bgcolor=#d6d6d6
| 586073 ||  || — || March 10, 2007 || Mount Lemmon || Mount Lemmon Survey ||  || align=right | 2.6 km || 
|-id=074 bgcolor=#E9E9E9
| 586074 ||  || — || August 11, 2012 || Siding Spring || SSS ||  || align=right | 1.7 km || 
|-id=075 bgcolor=#d6d6d6
| 586075 ||  || — || February 25, 2007 || Mount Lemmon || Mount Lemmon Survey ||  || align=right | 2.5 km || 
|-id=076 bgcolor=#fefefe
| 586076 ||  || — || February 2, 2001 || Kitt Peak || Spacewatch ||  || align=right data-sort-value="0.57" | 570 m || 
|-id=077 bgcolor=#d6d6d6
| 586077 ||  || — || February 19, 2001 || Kitt Peak || Spacewatch ||  || align=right | 2.3 km || 
|-id=078 bgcolor=#d6d6d6
| 586078 ||  || — || January 21, 2012 || Kitt Peak || Spacewatch ||  || align=right | 2.3 km || 
|-id=079 bgcolor=#fefefe
| 586079 ||  || — || March 11, 2005 || Kitt Peak || Spacewatch ||  || align=right data-sort-value="0.69" | 690 m || 
|-id=080 bgcolor=#E9E9E9
| 586080 ||  || — || September 26, 2011 || Mount Lemmon || Mount Lemmon Survey ||  || align=right | 1.4 km || 
|-id=081 bgcolor=#fefefe
| 586081 ||  || — || October 25, 2003 || Kitt Peak || Spacewatch ||  || align=right data-sort-value="0.52" | 520 m || 
|-id=082 bgcolor=#E9E9E9
| 586082 ||  || — || January 10, 2014 || Mount Lemmon || Mount Lemmon Survey ||  || align=right | 1.6 km || 
|-id=083 bgcolor=#fefefe
| 586083 ||  || — || January 20, 2015 || Haleakala || Pan-STARRS ||  || align=right data-sort-value="0.64" | 640 m || 
|-id=084 bgcolor=#d6d6d6
| 586084 ||  || — || February 21, 2001 || Kitt Peak || Spacewatch ||  || align=right | 2.6 km || 
|-id=085 bgcolor=#d6d6d6
| 586085 ||  || — || January 30, 2012 || Kitt Peak || Spacewatch ||  || align=right | 3.0 km || 
|-id=086 bgcolor=#E9E9E9
| 586086 ||  || — || February 20, 2001 || Apache Point || SDSS Collaboration ||  || align=right | 1.1 km || 
|-id=087 bgcolor=#d6d6d6
| 586087 ||  || — || November 10, 2010 || Mount Lemmon || Mount Lemmon Survey ||  || align=right | 3.2 km || 
|-id=088 bgcolor=#d6d6d6
| 586088 ||  || — || October 13, 2016 || Haleakala || Pan-STARRS ||  || align=right | 2.6 km || 
|-id=089 bgcolor=#C2FFFF
| 586089 ||  || — || January 18, 2013 || Mount Lemmon || Mount Lemmon Survey || L4 || align=right | 9.3 km || 
|-id=090 bgcolor=#d6d6d6
| 586090 ||  || — || October 15, 2004 || Kitt Peak || Spacewatch ||  || align=right | 2.4 km || 
|-id=091 bgcolor=#E9E9E9
| 586091 ||  || — || February 24, 2001 || Haleakala || AMOS ||  || align=right | 2.2 km || 
|-id=092 bgcolor=#E9E9E9
| 586092 ||  || — || October 27, 2017 || Mount Lemmon || Mount Lemmon Survey ||  || align=right | 1.6 km || 
|-id=093 bgcolor=#d6d6d6
| 586093 ||  || — || March 12, 2013 || Mount Lemmon || Mount Lemmon Survey ||  || align=right | 2.4 km || 
|-id=094 bgcolor=#C2FFFF
| 586094 ||  || — || November 15, 1998 || Kitt Peak || Spacewatch || L4 || align=right | 8.2 km || 
|-id=095 bgcolor=#E9E9E9
| 586095 ||  || — || September 19, 2003 || Kitt Peak || Spacewatch ||  || align=right | 2.1 km || 
|-id=096 bgcolor=#d6d6d6
| 586096 ||  || — || September 18, 2014 || Haleakala || Pan-STARRS ||  || align=right | 2.0 km || 
|-id=097 bgcolor=#d6d6d6
| 586097 ||  || — || December 30, 2005 || Kitt Peak || Spacewatch ||  || align=right | 2.0 km || 
|-id=098 bgcolor=#fefefe
| 586098 ||  || — || March 20, 2001 || Kitt Peak || Spacewatch ||  || align=right data-sort-value="0.53" | 530 m || 
|-id=099 bgcolor=#E9E9E9
| 586099 ||  || — || March 21, 2001 || Kitt Peak || Spacewatch ||  || align=right | 1.5 km || 
|-id=100 bgcolor=#fefefe
| 586100 ||  || — || March 26, 2001 || Kitt Peak || Spacewatch ||  || align=right data-sort-value="0.60" | 600 m || 
|}

586101–586200 

|-bgcolor=#E9E9E9
| 586101 ||  || — || September 17, 2003 || Kitt Peak || Spacewatch ||  || align=right | 1.7 km || 
|-id=102 bgcolor=#E9E9E9
| 586102 ||  || — || September 21, 2003 || Kitt Peak || Spacewatch ||  || align=right | 1.7 km || 
|-id=103 bgcolor=#E9E9E9
| 586103 ||  || — || November 19, 2008 || Kitt Peak || Spacewatch ||  || align=right | 1.6 km || 
|-id=104 bgcolor=#fefefe
| 586104 ||  || — || September 25, 2006 || Mount Lemmon || Mount Lemmon Survey ||  || align=right data-sort-value="0.70" | 700 m || 
|-id=105 bgcolor=#d6d6d6
| 586105 ||  || — || March 21, 2001 || Kitt Peak || Kitt Peak Obs. ||  || align=right | 2.5 km || 
|-id=106 bgcolor=#fefefe
| 586106 ||  || — || March 21, 2001 || Kitt Peak || Kitt Peak Obs. ||  || align=right data-sort-value="0.58" | 580 m || 
|-id=107 bgcolor=#d6d6d6
| 586107 ||  || — || May 31, 2008 || Kitt Peak || Spacewatch ||  || align=right | 2.9 km || 
|-id=108 bgcolor=#E9E9E9
| 586108 ||  || — || March 29, 2001 || Kitt Peak || Kitt Peak Obs. ||  || align=right | 1.5 km || 
|-id=109 bgcolor=#fefefe
| 586109 ||  || — || March 30, 2001 || Kitt Peak || Kitt Peak Obs. ||  || align=right data-sort-value="0.46" | 460 m || 
|-id=110 bgcolor=#d6d6d6
| 586110 ||  || — || March 15, 2007 || Kitt Peak || Spacewatch ||  || align=right | 2.5 km || 
|-id=111 bgcolor=#fefefe
| 586111 ||  || — || December 16, 2003 || Kitt Peak || Spacewatch ||  || align=right data-sort-value="0.66" | 660 m || 
|-id=112 bgcolor=#d6d6d6
| 586112 ||  || — || March 25, 2007 || Mount Lemmon || Mount Lemmon Survey ||  || align=right | 3.0 km || 
|-id=113 bgcolor=#E9E9E9
| 586113 ||  || — || October 18, 2007 || Mount Lemmon || Mount Lemmon Survey ||  || align=right | 1.4 km || 
|-id=114 bgcolor=#fefefe
| 586114 ||  || — || January 19, 2012 || Haleakala || Pan-STARRS ||  || align=right data-sort-value="0.87" | 870 m || 
|-id=115 bgcolor=#E9E9E9
| 586115 ||  || — || December 31, 2013 || Kitt Peak || Spacewatch ||  || align=right | 1.7 km || 
|-id=116 bgcolor=#E9E9E9
| 586116 ||  || — || September 4, 2010 || Mount Lemmon || Mount Lemmon Survey ||  || align=right | 1.1 km || 
|-id=117 bgcolor=#E9E9E9
| 586117 ||  || — || March 13, 2005 || Mount Lemmon || Mount Lemmon Survey ||  || align=right | 1.8 km || 
|-id=118 bgcolor=#E9E9E9
| 586118 ||  || — || November 18, 2003 || Kitt Peak || Spacewatch ||  || align=right | 1.2 km || 
|-id=119 bgcolor=#E9E9E9
| 586119 ||  || — || May 11, 2015 || Mount Lemmon || Mount Lemmon Survey ||  || align=right | 1.6 km || 
|-id=120 bgcolor=#d6d6d6
| 586120 ||  || — || June 24, 2014 || Haleakala || Pan-STARRS ||  || align=right | 2.3 km || 
|-id=121 bgcolor=#fefefe
| 586121 ||  || — || February 9, 2008 || Mount Lemmon || Mount Lemmon Survey ||  || align=right data-sort-value="0.93" | 930 m || 
|-id=122 bgcolor=#d6d6d6
| 586122 ||  || — || August 12, 2001 || Palomar || NEAT || BRA || align=right | 1.5 km || 
|-id=123 bgcolor=#fefefe
| 586123 ||  || — || August 22, 2001 || Socorro || LINEAR ||  || align=right | 1.2 km || 
|-id=124 bgcolor=#E9E9E9
| 586124 ||  || — || August 21, 2001 || Kitt Peak || Spacewatch ||  || align=right | 2.0 km || 
|-id=125 bgcolor=#fefefe
| 586125 ||  || — || August 16, 2001 || Palomar || NEAT ||  || align=right data-sort-value="0.87" | 870 m || 
|-id=126 bgcolor=#E9E9E9
| 586126 ||  || — || August 19, 2001 || Cerro Tololo || Cerro Tololo Obs. ||  || align=right data-sort-value="0.72" | 720 m || 
|-id=127 bgcolor=#d6d6d6
| 586127 ||  || — || October 23, 2012 || Kitt Peak || Spacewatch ||  || align=right | 2.1 km || 
|-id=128 bgcolor=#fefefe
| 586128 ||  || — || March 14, 2007 || Kitt Peak || Spacewatch ||  || align=right data-sort-value="0.80" | 800 m || 
|-id=129 bgcolor=#d6d6d6
| 586129 ||  || — || August 28, 2014 || Haleakala || Pan-STARRS || 7:4 || align=right | 3.8 km || 
|-id=130 bgcolor=#fefefe
| 586130 ||  || — || February 1, 2013 || Kitt Peak || Spacewatch ||  || align=right data-sort-value="0.61" | 610 m || 
|-id=131 bgcolor=#d6d6d6
| 586131 ||  || — || September 12, 2001 || Kitt Peak || Spacewatch ||  || align=right | 2.1 km || 
|-id=132 bgcolor=#fefefe
| 586132 ||  || — || December 21, 2014 || Haleakala || Pan-STARRS ||  || align=right data-sort-value="0.66" | 660 m || 
|-id=133 bgcolor=#d6d6d6
| 586133 ||  || — || December 22, 2012 || Haleakala || Pan-STARRS ||  || align=right | 2.0 km || 
|-id=134 bgcolor=#fefefe
| 586134 ||  || — || May 22, 2001 || Cerro Tololo || J. L. Elliot, L. H. Wasserman ||  || align=right data-sort-value="0.71" | 710 m || 
|-id=135 bgcolor=#fefefe
| 586135 ||  || — || September 19, 2001 || Socorro || LINEAR ||  || align=right data-sort-value="0.76" | 760 m || 
|-id=136 bgcolor=#d6d6d6
| 586136 ||  || — || September 19, 2001 || Socorro || LINEAR ||  || align=right | 2.6 km || 
|-id=137 bgcolor=#d6d6d6
| 586137 ||  || — || September 21, 2001 || Socorro || LINEAR ||  || align=right | 2.0 km || 
|-id=138 bgcolor=#E9E9E9
| 586138 ||  || — || September 21, 2001 || Socorro || LINEAR ||  || align=right data-sort-value="0.53" | 530 m || 
|-id=139 bgcolor=#E9E9E9
| 586139 ||  || — || September 21, 2001 || Kitt Peak || Spacewatch ||  || align=right data-sort-value="0.95" | 950 m || 
|-id=140 bgcolor=#E9E9E9
| 586140 ||  || — || September 28, 2001 || Palomar || NEAT ||  || align=right | 1.3 km || 
|-id=141 bgcolor=#d6d6d6
| 586141 ||  || — || August 28, 2006 || Kitt Peak || Spacewatch ||  || align=right | 1.9 km || 
|-id=142 bgcolor=#E9E9E9
| 586142 ||  || — || September 22, 2017 || Haleakala || Pan-STARRS ||  || align=right data-sort-value="0.92" | 920 m || 
|-id=143 bgcolor=#fefefe
| 586143 ||  || — || September 22, 2001 || Kitt Peak || Spacewatch ||  || align=right data-sort-value="0.45" | 450 m || 
|-id=144 bgcolor=#E9E9E9
| 586144 ||  || — || October 14, 2001 || Socorro || LINEAR ||  || align=right | 1.3 km || 
|-id=145 bgcolor=#E9E9E9
| 586145 ||  || — || April 6, 2008 || Kitt Peak || Spacewatch ||  || align=right data-sort-value="0.73" | 730 m || 
|-id=146 bgcolor=#fefefe
| 586146 ||  || — || September 18, 2001 || Kitt Peak || Spacewatch ||  || align=right data-sort-value="0.42" | 420 m || 
|-id=147 bgcolor=#FA8072
| 586147 ||  || — || October 14, 2001 || Socorro || LINEAR ||  || align=right data-sort-value="0.51" | 510 m || 
|-id=148 bgcolor=#fefefe
| 586148 ||  || — || October 18, 2001 || Palomar || NEAT ||  || align=right data-sort-value="0.64" | 640 m || 
|-id=149 bgcolor=#fefefe
| 586149 ||  || — || October 21, 2001 || Socorro || LINEAR || H || align=right data-sort-value="0.51" | 510 m || 
|-id=150 bgcolor=#E9E9E9
| 586150 ||  || — || October 21, 2001 || Socorro || LINEAR ||  || align=right | 1.3 km || 
|-id=151 bgcolor=#fefefe
| 586151 ||  || — || November 18, 2001 || Apache Point || SDSS Collaboration ||  || align=right data-sort-value="0.57" | 570 m || 
|-id=152 bgcolor=#d6d6d6
| 586152 ||  || — || October 26, 2001 || Kitt Peak || Spacewatch ||  || align=right | 2.9 km || 
|-id=153 bgcolor=#E9E9E9
| 586153 ||  || — || April 24, 2003 || Kitt Peak || Spacewatch ||  || align=right data-sort-value="0.89" | 890 m || 
|-id=154 bgcolor=#E9E9E9
| 586154 ||  || — || October 25, 2001 || Apache Point || SDSS Collaboration ||  || align=right data-sort-value="0.92" | 920 m || 
|-id=155 bgcolor=#d6d6d6
| 586155 ||  || — || September 18, 2006 || Kitt Peak || Spacewatch ||  || align=right | 2.3 km || 
|-id=156 bgcolor=#E9E9E9
| 586156 ||  || — || October 5, 2013 || Haleakala || Pan-STARRS ||  || align=right data-sort-value="0.77" | 770 m || 
|-id=157 bgcolor=#fefefe
| 586157 ||  || — || October 29, 2008 || Kitt Peak || Spacewatch ||  || align=right data-sort-value="0.50" | 500 m || 
|-id=158 bgcolor=#E9E9E9
| 586158 ||  || — || October 24, 2005 || Kitt Peak || Spacewatch ||  || align=right data-sort-value="0.43" | 430 m || 
|-id=159 bgcolor=#d6d6d6
| 586159 ||  || — || December 4, 2007 || Mount Lemmon || Mount Lemmon Survey ||  || align=right | 2.3 km || 
|-id=160 bgcolor=#E9E9E9
| 586160 ||  || — || November 20, 2001 || Socorro || LINEAR ||  || align=right data-sort-value="0.89" | 890 m || 
|-id=161 bgcolor=#E9E9E9
| 586161 ||  || — || September 26, 2005 || Kitt Peak || Spacewatch ||  || align=right data-sort-value="0.86" | 860 m || 
|-id=162 bgcolor=#E9E9E9
| 586162 ||  || — || December 9, 2001 || Socorro || LINEAR || MAR || align=right | 1.6 km || 
|-id=163 bgcolor=#fefefe
| 586163 ||  || — || December 14, 2001 || Socorro || LINEAR ||  || align=right data-sort-value="0.83" | 830 m || 
|-id=164 bgcolor=#fefefe
| 586164 ||  || — || December 14, 2001 || Socorro || LINEAR ||  || align=right data-sort-value="0.66" | 660 m || 
|-id=165 bgcolor=#d6d6d6
| 586165 ||  || — || October 8, 2016 || Haleakala || Pan-STARRS ||  || align=right | 2.2 km || 
|-id=166 bgcolor=#d6d6d6
| 586166 ||  || — || December 18, 2001 || Socorro || LINEAR ||  || align=right | 2.1 km || 
|-id=167 bgcolor=#fefefe
| 586167 ||  || — || December 17, 2001 || Socorro || LINEAR ||  || align=right data-sort-value="0.74" | 740 m || 
|-id=168 bgcolor=#d6d6d6
| 586168 ||  || — || October 20, 2011 || Mount Lemmon || Mount Lemmon Survey ||  || align=right | 2.1 km || 
|-id=169 bgcolor=#d6d6d6
| 586169 ||  || — || May 20, 2004 || Kitt Peak || Spacewatch ||  || align=right | 2.6 km || 
|-id=170 bgcolor=#d6d6d6
| 586170 ||  || — || January 9, 2002 || Cima Ekar || Asiago Obs. ||  || align=right | 2.6 km || 
|-id=171 bgcolor=#d6d6d6
| 586171 ||  || — || January 12, 2002 || Palomar || NEAT ||  || align=right | 2.8 km || 
|-id=172 bgcolor=#d6d6d6
| 586172 ||  || — || January 13, 2002 || Kitt Peak || Spacewatch ||  || align=right | 3.2 km || 
|-id=173 bgcolor=#d6d6d6
| 586173 ||  || — || January 19, 2002 || Anderson Mesa || LONEOS ||  || align=right | 2.0 km || 
|-id=174 bgcolor=#d6d6d6
| 586174 ||  || — || August 31, 2005 || Kitt Peak || Spacewatch ||  || align=right | 2.9 km || 
|-id=175 bgcolor=#d6d6d6
| 586175 ||  || — || March 3, 2013 || Haleakala || Pan-STARRS ||  || align=right | 2.1 km || 
|-id=176 bgcolor=#d6d6d6
| 586176 ||  || — || March 5, 2013 || Haleakala || Pan-STARRS ||  || align=right | 2.0 km || 
|-id=177 bgcolor=#d6d6d6
| 586177 ||  || — || December 28, 2011 || Mount Lemmon || Mount Lemmon Survey ||  || align=right | 2.5 km || 
|-id=178 bgcolor=#fefefe
| 586178 ||  || — || January 30, 2009 || Mount Lemmon || Mount Lemmon Survey ||  || align=right data-sort-value="0.54" | 540 m || 
|-id=179 bgcolor=#d6d6d6
| 586179 ||  || — || October 6, 2016 || Haleakala || Pan-STARRS ||  || align=right | 2.0 km || 
|-id=180 bgcolor=#d6d6d6
| 586180 ||  || — || November 25, 2011 || Haleakala || Pan-STARRS ||  || align=right | 2.2 km || 
|-id=181 bgcolor=#fefefe
| 586181 ||  || — || December 1, 2011 || Haleakala || Pan-STARRS ||  || align=right data-sort-value="0.58" | 580 m || 
|-id=182 bgcolor=#d6d6d6
| 586182 ||  || — || February 8, 2008 || Kitt Peak || Spacewatch ||  || align=right | 1.9 km || 
|-id=183 bgcolor=#E9E9E9
| 586183 ||  || — || January 14, 2002 || Socorro || LINEAR ||  || align=right | 1.5 km || 
|-id=184 bgcolor=#E9E9E9
| 586184 ||  || — || January 12, 2002 || Palomar || NEAT || EUN || align=right | 1.6 km || 
|-id=185 bgcolor=#fefefe
| 586185 ||  || — || February 8, 2002 || Palomar || NEAT || H || align=right data-sort-value="0.77" | 770 m || 
|-id=186 bgcolor=#d6d6d6
| 586186 ||  || — || January 14, 2002 || Kitt Peak || Spacewatch ||  || align=right | 2.5 km || 
|-id=187 bgcolor=#E9E9E9
| 586187 ||  || — || February 10, 2002 || Socorro || LINEAR ||  || align=right | 1.7 km || 
|-id=188 bgcolor=#d6d6d6
| 586188 ||  || — || February 7, 2002 || Palomar || NEAT ||  || align=right | 2.2 km || 
|-id=189 bgcolor=#d6d6d6
| 586189 ||  || — || February 7, 2002 || Kitt Peak || Spacewatch ||  || align=right | 2.3 km || 
|-id=190 bgcolor=#d6d6d6
| 586190 ||  || — || February 7, 2002 || Palomar || NEAT ||  || align=right | 1.8 km || 
|-id=191 bgcolor=#d6d6d6
| 586191 ||  || — || February 9, 2002 || Kitt Peak || Spacewatch ||  || align=right | 3.2 km || 
|-id=192 bgcolor=#E9E9E9
| 586192 ||  || — || February 7, 2002 || Kitt Peak || Spacewatch ||  || align=right | 1.3 km || 
|-id=193 bgcolor=#fefefe
| 586193 ||  || — || February 10, 2002 || Socorro || LINEAR || H || align=right data-sort-value="0.55" | 550 m || 
|-id=194 bgcolor=#C2FFFF
| 586194 ||  || — || February 13, 2002 || Kitt Peak || Spacewatch || L4 || align=right | 9.7 km || 
|-id=195 bgcolor=#d6d6d6
| 586195 ||  || — || October 23, 2011 || Haleakala || Pan-STARRS ||  || align=right | 2.3 km || 
|-id=196 bgcolor=#E9E9E9
| 586196 ||  || — || December 10, 2014 || Haleakala || Pan-STARRS ||  || align=right | 1.7 km || 
|-id=197 bgcolor=#d6d6d6
| 586197 ||  || — || September 28, 2011 || Kitt Peak || Spacewatch ||  || align=right | 2.1 km || 
|-id=198 bgcolor=#C2FFFF
| 586198 ||  || — || September 7, 2008 || Catalina || CSS || L4 || align=right | 7.5 km || 
|-id=199 bgcolor=#E9E9E9
| 586199 ||  || — || September 17, 2017 || Haleakala || Pan-STARRS ||  || align=right data-sort-value="0.89" | 890 m || 
|-id=200 bgcolor=#C2FFFF
| 586200 ||  || — || September 28, 2009 || Mount Lemmon || Mount Lemmon Survey || L4 || align=right | 6.0 km || 
|}

586201–586300 

|-bgcolor=#E9E9E9
| 586201 ||  || — || March 13, 2011 || Mount Lemmon || Mount Lemmon Survey ||  || align=right | 1.2 km || 
|-id=202 bgcolor=#d6d6d6
| 586202 ||  || — || October 9, 2016 || Haleakala || Pan-STARRS ||  || align=right | 2.2 km || 
|-id=203 bgcolor=#E9E9E9
| 586203 ||  || — || September 5, 2008 || Kitt Peak || Spacewatch ||  || align=right | 1.1 km || 
|-id=204 bgcolor=#C2FFFF
| 586204 ||  || — || April 10, 2015 || Haleakala || Pan-STARRS || L4 || align=right | 6.6 km || 
|-id=205 bgcolor=#d6d6d6
| 586205 ||  || — || February 13, 2002 || Apache Point || SDSS Collaboration ||  || align=right | 2.2 km || 
|-id=206 bgcolor=#fefefe
| 586206 ||  || — || February 19, 2002 || Socorro || LINEAR || H || align=right data-sort-value="0.75" | 750 m || 
|-id=207 bgcolor=#d6d6d6
| 586207 ||  || — || February 20, 2002 || Kitt Peak || Spacewatch ||  || align=right | 2.3 km || 
|-id=208 bgcolor=#fefefe
| 586208 ||  || — || February 16, 2002 || Palomar || NEAT ||  || align=right data-sort-value="0.97" | 970 m || 
|-id=209 bgcolor=#fefefe
| 586209 ||  || — || February 20, 2002 || Kitt Peak || Spacewatch ||  || align=right data-sort-value="0.68" | 680 m || 
|-id=210 bgcolor=#d6d6d6
| 586210 ||  || — || October 2, 2010 || Kitt Peak || Spacewatch ||  || align=right | 2.2 km || 
|-id=211 bgcolor=#d6d6d6
| 586211 ||  || — || February 7, 2013 || Kitt Peak || Spacewatch ||  || align=right | 2.6 km || 
|-id=212 bgcolor=#d6d6d6
| 586212 ||  || — || March 8, 2013 || Haleakala || Pan-STARRS ||  || align=right | 2.7 km || 
|-id=213 bgcolor=#fefefe
| 586213 ||  || — || March 9, 2002 || Kitt Peak || Spacewatch ||  || align=right data-sort-value="0.52" | 520 m || 
|-id=214 bgcolor=#E9E9E9
| 586214 ||  || — || February 19, 2002 || Uppsala-Kvistaberg || Kvistaberg Obs. ||  || align=right | 1.5 km || 
|-id=215 bgcolor=#E9E9E9
| 586215 ||  || — || March 10, 2002 || Haleakala || AMOS ||  || align=right | 1.7 km || 
|-id=216 bgcolor=#d6d6d6
| 586216 ||  || — || March 13, 2002 || Palomar || NEAT ||  || align=right | 3.1 km || 
|-id=217 bgcolor=#E9E9E9
| 586217 ||  || — || February 20, 2002 || Kitt Peak || Spacewatch ||  || align=right | 1.3 km || 
|-id=218 bgcolor=#fefefe
| 586218 ||  || — || March 10, 2002 || Kitt Peak || Spacewatch ||  || align=right data-sort-value="0.86" | 860 m || 
|-id=219 bgcolor=#E9E9E9
| 586219 ||  || — || March 12, 2002 || Kitt Peak || Spacewatch ||  || align=right | 1.1 km || 
|-id=220 bgcolor=#E9E9E9
| 586220 ||  || — || March 13, 2002 || Palomar || NEAT ||  || align=right | 1.2 km || 
|-id=221 bgcolor=#fefefe
| 586221 ||  || — || March 12, 2002 || Palomar || NEAT ||  || align=right data-sort-value="0.70" | 700 m || 
|-id=222 bgcolor=#d6d6d6
| 586222 ||  || — || March 5, 2002 || Anderson Mesa || LONEOS || TIR || align=right | 3.0 km || 
|-id=223 bgcolor=#d6d6d6
| 586223 ||  || — || March 4, 2002 || Kitt Peak || Spacewatch ||  || align=right | 2.5 km || 
|-id=224 bgcolor=#d6d6d6
| 586224 ||  || — || February 28, 2008 || Kitt Peak || Spacewatch ||  || align=right | 3.0 km || 
|-id=225 bgcolor=#C2FFFF
| 586225 ||  || — || October 12, 2010 || Mount Lemmon || Mount Lemmon Survey || L4 || align=right | 8.2 km || 
|-id=226 bgcolor=#E9E9E9
| 586226 ||  || — || May 21, 2011 || Mount Lemmon || Mount Lemmon Survey ||  || align=right | 1.6 km || 
|-id=227 bgcolor=#d6d6d6
| 586227 ||  || — || January 28, 2007 || Mount Lemmon || Mount Lemmon Survey ||  || align=right | 2.0 km || 
|-id=228 bgcolor=#E9E9E9
| 586228 ||  || — || March 13, 2002 || Kitt Peak || Spacewatch ||  || align=right data-sort-value="0.94" | 940 m || 
|-id=229 bgcolor=#d6d6d6
| 586229 ||  || — || March 13, 2002 || Kitt Peak || Spacewatch ||  || align=right | 2.0 km || 
|-id=230 bgcolor=#fefefe
| 586230 ||  || — || April 29, 2006 || Kitt Peak || Spacewatch ||  || align=right data-sort-value="0.63" | 630 m || 
|-id=231 bgcolor=#fefefe
| 586231 ||  || — || January 17, 2016 || Haleakala || Pan-STARRS ||  || align=right data-sort-value="0.53" | 530 m || 
|-id=232 bgcolor=#d6d6d6
| 586232 ||  || — || January 27, 2007 || Mount Lemmon || Mount Lemmon Survey ||  || align=right | 2.2 km || 
|-id=233 bgcolor=#d6d6d6
| 586233 ||  || — || March 28, 2008 || Mount Lemmon || Mount Lemmon Survey ||  || align=right | 2.0 km || 
|-id=234 bgcolor=#d6d6d6
| 586234 ||  || — || January 24, 2007 || Mount Lemmon || Mount Lemmon Survey ||  || align=right | 2.2 km || 
|-id=235 bgcolor=#d6d6d6
| 586235 ||  || — || June 5, 2014 || Haleakala || Pan-STARRS ||  || align=right | 2.4 km || 
|-id=236 bgcolor=#C2FFFF
| 586236 ||  || — || March 18, 2002 || Kitt Peak || M. W. Buie, D. E. Trilling || L4ERY || align=right | 6.0 km || 
|-id=237 bgcolor=#d6d6d6
| 586237 ||  || — || March 21, 2002 || Palomar || NEAT ||  || align=right | 2.4 km || 
|-id=238 bgcolor=#d6d6d6
| 586238 ||  || — || March 21, 2002 || Palomar || NEAT ||  || align=right | 3.0 km || 
|-id=239 bgcolor=#fefefe
| 586239 ||  || — || February 25, 2002 || Palomar || NEAT || H || align=right data-sort-value="0.58" | 580 m || 
|-id=240 bgcolor=#C2FFFF
| 586240 ||  || — || October 17, 2010 || Mount Lemmon || Mount Lemmon Survey || L4 || align=right | 6.6 km || 
|-id=241 bgcolor=#fefefe
| 586241 ||  || — || March 20, 2002 || Kitt Peak || Spacewatch ||  || align=right data-sort-value="0.60" | 600 m || 
|-id=242 bgcolor=#E9E9E9
| 586242 ||  || — || April 13, 2011 || Kitt Peak || Spacewatch ||  || align=right | 1.4 km || 
|-id=243 bgcolor=#fefefe
| 586243 ||  || — || March 6, 2002 || Socorro || LINEAR ||  || align=right | 1.2 km || 
|-id=244 bgcolor=#E9E9E9
| 586244 ||  || — || April 4, 2002 || Palomar || NEAT ||  || align=right | 1.7 km || 
|-id=245 bgcolor=#E9E9E9
| 586245 ||  || — || April 2, 2002 || Kitt Peak || Spacewatch ||  || align=right | 1.5 km || 
|-id=246 bgcolor=#E9E9E9
| 586246 ||  || — || April 4, 2002 || Palomar || NEAT ||  || align=right | 1.6 km || 
|-id=247 bgcolor=#d6d6d6
| 586247 ||  || — || April 5, 2002 || Palomar || NEAT ||  || align=right | 3.9 km || 
|-id=248 bgcolor=#E9E9E9
| 586248 ||  || — || April 4, 2002 || Palomar || NEAT ||  || align=right | 1.5 km || 
|-id=249 bgcolor=#E9E9E9
| 586249 ||  || — || April 12, 2002 || Kitt Peak || Spacewatch ||  || align=right | 1.7 km || 
|-id=250 bgcolor=#E9E9E9
| 586250 ||  || — || April 2, 2002 || Palomar || NEAT ||  || align=right | 2.3 km || 
|-id=251 bgcolor=#d6d6d6
| 586251 ||  || — || April 4, 2002 || Palomar || NEAT ||  || align=right | 2.9 km || 
|-id=252 bgcolor=#d6d6d6
| 586252 ||  || — || April 8, 2002 || Kitt Peak || Spacewatch ||  || align=right | 2.3 km || 
|-id=253 bgcolor=#fefefe
| 586253 ||  || — || March 3, 2009 || Mount Lemmon || Mount Lemmon Survey ||  || align=right data-sort-value="0.66" | 660 m || 
|-id=254 bgcolor=#fefefe
| 586254 ||  || — || March 1, 2009 || Kitt Peak || Spacewatch ||  || align=right data-sort-value="0.59" | 590 m || 
|-id=255 bgcolor=#E9E9E9
| 586255 ||  || — || September 7, 2004 || Kitt Peak || Spacewatch ||  || align=right | 1.6 km || 
|-id=256 bgcolor=#fefefe
| 586256 ||  || — || March 16, 2002 || Kitt Peak || Spacewatch ||  || align=right data-sort-value="0.67" | 670 m || 
|-id=257 bgcolor=#E9E9E9
| 586257 ||  || — || January 28, 2011 || Kitt Peak || Spacewatch ||  || align=right | 3.0 km || 
|-id=258 bgcolor=#d6d6d6
| 586258 ||  || — || September 17, 2010 || Mount Lemmon || Mount Lemmon Survey ||  || align=right | 3.0 km || 
|-id=259 bgcolor=#fefefe
| 586259 ||  || — || September 1, 2014 || Mount Lemmon || Mount Lemmon Survey ||  || align=right | 1.1 km || 
|-id=260 bgcolor=#d6d6d6
| 586260 ||  || — || February 7, 2013 || Kitt Peak || Spacewatch ||  || align=right | 2.4 km || 
|-id=261 bgcolor=#E9E9E9
| 586261 ||  || — || August 6, 2012 || Haleakala || Pan-STARRS ||  || align=right | 1.4 km || 
|-id=262 bgcolor=#E9E9E9
| 586262 ||  || — || January 6, 2006 || Anderson Mesa || LONEOS ||  || align=right | 1.5 km || 
|-id=263 bgcolor=#fefefe
| 586263 ||  || — || April 15, 2013 || Haleakala || Pan-STARRS ||  || align=right data-sort-value="0.64" | 640 m || 
|-id=264 bgcolor=#C2FFFF
| 586264 ||  || — || January 20, 2013 || Mount Lemmon || Mount Lemmon Survey || L4 || align=right | 7.0 km || 
|-id=265 bgcolor=#fefefe
| 586265 ||  || — || October 23, 2003 || Kitt Peak || Spacewatch ||  || align=right data-sort-value="0.61" | 610 m || 
|-id=266 bgcolor=#d6d6d6
| 586266 ||  || — || April 10, 2013 || Haleakala || Pan-STARRS ||  || align=right | 2.3 km || 
|-id=267 bgcolor=#E9E9E9
| 586267 ||  || — || September 18, 2012 || Mount Lemmon || Mount Lemmon Survey ||  || align=right | 1.1 km || 
|-id=268 bgcolor=#fefefe
| 586268 ||  || — || January 21, 2013 || Haleakala || Pan-STARRS ||  || align=right data-sort-value="0.78" | 780 m || 
|-id=269 bgcolor=#d6d6d6
| 586269 ||  || — || March 13, 2007 || Kitt Peak || Spacewatch ||  || align=right | 2.2 km || 
|-id=270 bgcolor=#fefefe
| 586270 ||  || — || April 16, 2013 || Haleakala || Pan-STARRS ||  || align=right data-sort-value="0.45" | 450 m || 
|-id=271 bgcolor=#d6d6d6
| 586271 ||  || — || January 27, 2012 || Mount Lemmon || Mount Lemmon Survey ||  || align=right | 2.4 km || 
|-id=272 bgcolor=#E9E9E9
| 586272 ||  || — || May 18, 2002 || Kitt Peak || Spacewatch ||  || align=right | 1.5 km || 
|-id=273 bgcolor=#E9E9E9
| 586273 ||  || — || June 11, 2002 || Kitt Peak || Spacewatch ||  || align=right | 2.1 km || 
|-id=274 bgcolor=#fefefe
| 586274 ||  || — || November 27, 2014 || Haleakala || Pan-STARRS ||  || align=right data-sort-value="0.80" | 800 m || 
|-id=275 bgcolor=#E9E9E9
| 586275 ||  || — || May 3, 2006 || Kitt Peak || Spacewatch || GEF || align=right | 1.0 km || 
|-id=276 bgcolor=#fefefe
| 586276 ||  || — || July 3, 2002 || Palomar || NEAT ||  || align=right data-sort-value="0.80" | 800 m || 
|-id=277 bgcolor=#fefefe
| 586277 ||  || — || June 16, 2002 || Palomar || NEAT ||  || align=right | 1.0 km || 
|-id=278 bgcolor=#E9E9E9
| 586278 ||  || — || November 24, 2003 || Kitt Peak || Kitt Peak Obs. ||  || align=right | 1.4 km || 
|-id=279 bgcolor=#E9E9E9
| 586279 ||  || — || May 21, 2011 || Mount Lemmon || Mount Lemmon Survey ||  || align=right | 1.6 km || 
|-id=280 bgcolor=#d6d6d6
| 586280 ||  || — || January 23, 2006 || Mount Lemmon || Mount Lemmon Survey ||  || align=right | 3.4 km || 
|-id=281 bgcolor=#E9E9E9
| 586281 ||  || — || September 20, 2007 || Catalina || CSS ||  || align=right | 1.9 km || 
|-id=282 bgcolor=#E9E9E9
| 586282 ||  || — || July 22, 2002 || Palomar || NEAT ||  || align=right | 2.2 km || 
|-id=283 bgcolor=#d6d6d6
| 586283 ||  || — || February 4, 2006 || Kitt Peak || Spacewatch ||  || align=right | 2.4 km || 
|-id=284 bgcolor=#E9E9E9
| 586284 ||  || — || April 12, 2010 || Mount Lemmon || Mount Lemmon Survey ||  || align=right | 1.8 km || 
|-id=285 bgcolor=#fefefe
| 586285 ||  || — || July 17, 2010 || Siding Spring || SSS || H || align=right data-sort-value="0.59" | 590 m || 
|-id=286 bgcolor=#E9E9E9
| 586286 ||  || — || August 6, 2002 || Palomar || NEAT ||  || align=right | 2.7 km || 
|-id=287 bgcolor=#fefefe
| 586287 ||  || — || July 29, 2002 || Palomar || NEAT || H || align=right data-sort-value="0.61" | 610 m || 
|-id=288 bgcolor=#E9E9E9
| 586288 ||  || — || October 8, 2007 || Catalina || CSS ||  || align=right | 2.2 km || 
|-id=289 bgcolor=#E9E9E9
| 586289 ||  || — || May 6, 2006 || Mount Lemmon || Mount Lemmon Survey ||  || align=right | 1.7 km || 
|-id=290 bgcolor=#E9E9E9
| 586290 ||  || — || August 13, 2002 || Palomar || NEAT ||  || align=right | 1.7 km || 
|-id=291 bgcolor=#E9E9E9
| 586291 ||  || — || April 15, 2010 || Mount Lemmon || Mount Lemmon Survey ||  || align=right | 2.2 km || 
|-id=292 bgcolor=#E9E9E9
| 586292 ||  || — || March 8, 2005 || Mount Lemmon || Mount Lemmon Survey ||  || align=right | 2.0 km || 
|-id=293 bgcolor=#E9E9E9
| 586293 ||  || — || August 19, 2002 || Palomar || NEAT ||  || align=right | 1.8 km || 
|-id=294 bgcolor=#E9E9E9
| 586294 ||  || — || December 24, 2013 || Mount Lemmon || Mount Lemmon Survey ||  || align=right | 2.0 km || 
|-id=295 bgcolor=#E9E9E9
| 586295 ||  || — || May 31, 2006 || Kitt Peak || Spacewatch ||  || align=right | 1.7 km || 
|-id=296 bgcolor=#fefefe
| 586296 ||  || — || August 17, 2002 || Palomar || NEAT ||  || align=right data-sort-value="0.70" | 700 m || 
|-id=297 bgcolor=#E9E9E9
| 586297 ||  || — || August 16, 2002 || Palomar || NEAT ||  || align=right | 2.1 km || 
|-id=298 bgcolor=#E9E9E9
| 586298 ||  || — || August 17, 2002 || Palomar || NEAT ||  || align=right | 1.7 km || 
|-id=299 bgcolor=#E9E9E9
| 586299 ||  || — || August 19, 2002 || Palomar || NEAT ||  || align=right | 2.0 km || 
|-id=300 bgcolor=#E9E9E9
| 586300 ||  || — || November 20, 2003 || Kitt Peak || Spacewatch ||  || align=right | 2.3 km || 
|}

586301–586400 

|-bgcolor=#E9E9E9
| 586301 ||  || — || July 21, 2002 || Palomar || NEAT ||  || align=right | 2.3 km || 
|-id=302 bgcolor=#E9E9E9
| 586302 ||  || — || February 2, 2009 || Mount Lemmon || Mount Lemmon Survey ||  || align=right | 2.2 km || 
|-id=303 bgcolor=#E9E9E9
| 586303 ||  || — || April 5, 2005 || Mount Lemmon || Mount Lemmon Survey ||  || align=right | 2.2 km || 
|-id=304 bgcolor=#E9E9E9
| 586304 ||  || — || December 17, 2003 || Kitt Peak || Spacewatch ||  || align=right | 1.9 km || 
|-id=305 bgcolor=#fefefe
| 586305 ||  || — || March 10, 2005 || Mount Lemmon || Mount Lemmon Survey ||  || align=right data-sort-value="0.75" | 750 m || 
|-id=306 bgcolor=#fefefe
| 586306 ||  || — || September 15, 2006 || Kitt Peak || Spacewatch ||  || align=right data-sort-value="0.63" | 630 m || 
|-id=307 bgcolor=#fefefe
| 586307 ||  || — || August 29, 2002 || Kitt Peak || Spacewatch ||  || align=right data-sort-value="0.64" | 640 m || 
|-id=308 bgcolor=#E9E9E9
| 586308 ||  || — || August 14, 2002 || Palomar || NEAT ||  || align=right | 1.6 km || 
|-id=309 bgcolor=#fefefe
| 586309 ||  || — || August 30, 2002 || Kitt Peak || Spacewatch ||  || align=right data-sort-value="0.73" | 730 m || 
|-id=310 bgcolor=#fefefe
| 586310 ||  || — || September 11, 2002 || Palomar || NEAT || H || align=right data-sort-value="0.62" | 620 m || 
|-id=311 bgcolor=#fefefe
| 586311 ||  || — || September 7, 2002 || Socorro || LINEAR ||  || align=right data-sort-value="0.66" | 660 m || 
|-id=312 bgcolor=#E9E9E9
| 586312 ||  || — || September 11, 2002 || Palomar || NEAT ||  || align=right | 1.1 km || 
|-id=313 bgcolor=#E9E9E9
| 586313 ||  || — || October 10, 2002 || Kitt Peak || Spacewatch ||  || align=right | 2.2 km || 
|-id=314 bgcolor=#E9E9E9
| 586314 ||  || — || April 11, 2005 || Mount Lemmon || Mount Lemmon Survey ||  || align=right data-sort-value="0.80" | 800 m || 
|-id=315 bgcolor=#E9E9E9
| 586315 ||  || — || March 16, 2005 || Kitt Peak || Spacewatch ||  || align=right | 2.0 km || 
|-id=316 bgcolor=#d6d6d6
| 586316 ||  || — || September 14, 2007 || Mount Lemmon || Mount Lemmon Survey ||  || align=right | 1.9 km || 
|-id=317 bgcolor=#E9E9E9
| 586317 ||  || — || October 10, 2007 || Kitt Peak || Spacewatch ||  || align=right | 2.0 km || 
|-id=318 bgcolor=#fefefe
| 586318 ||  || — || June 17, 2005 || Mount Lemmon || Mount Lemmon Survey ||  || align=right data-sort-value="0.55" | 550 m || 
|-id=319 bgcolor=#fefefe
| 586319 ||  || — || August 8, 2010 || Siding Spring || SSS || H || align=right data-sort-value="0.49" | 490 m || 
|-id=320 bgcolor=#E9E9E9
| 586320 ||  || — || August 12, 2002 || Haleakala || AMOS ||  || align=right | 1.1 km || 
|-id=321 bgcolor=#E9E9E9
| 586321 ||  || — || April 18, 2015 || Haleakala || Pan-STARRS ||  || align=right | 2.1 km || 
|-id=322 bgcolor=#E9E9E9
| 586322 ||  || — || September 28, 2002 || Palomar || NEAT ||  || align=right | 1.8 km || 
|-id=323 bgcolor=#E9E9E9
| 586323 ||  || — || September 5, 2002 || Socorro || LINEAR ||  || align=right | 1.7 km || 
|-id=324 bgcolor=#E9E9E9
| 586324 ||  || — || September 16, 2002 || Haleakala || AMOS ||  || align=right data-sort-value="0.82" | 820 m || 
|-id=325 bgcolor=#fefefe
| 586325 ||  || — || August 19, 2002 || Palomar || NEAT ||  || align=right data-sort-value="0.77" | 770 m || 
|-id=326 bgcolor=#fefefe
| 586326 ||  || — || August 14, 2002 || Palomar || NEAT || H || align=right data-sort-value="0.64" | 640 m || 
|-id=327 bgcolor=#E9E9E9
| 586327 ||  || — || January 27, 2004 || Kitt Peak || Spacewatch ||  || align=right | 1.8 km || 
|-id=328 bgcolor=#E9E9E9
| 586328 ||  || — || October 1, 2002 || Haleakala || AMOS ||  || align=right | 1.5 km || 
|-id=329 bgcolor=#fefefe
| 586329 ||  || — || October 4, 2002 || Socorro || LINEAR || H || align=right data-sort-value="0.70" | 700 m || 
|-id=330 bgcolor=#FA8072
| 586330 ||  || — || September 12, 2002 || Palomar || NEAT ||  || align=right data-sort-value="0.73" | 730 m || 
|-id=331 bgcolor=#fefefe
| 586331 ||  || — || October 4, 2002 || Socorro || LINEAR ||  || align=right data-sort-value="0.67" | 670 m || 
|-id=332 bgcolor=#fefefe
| 586332 ||  || — || October 2, 2002 || Haleakala || AMOS || H || align=right data-sort-value="0.60" | 600 m || 
|-id=333 bgcolor=#E9E9E9
| 586333 ||  || — || October 4, 2002 || Palomar || NEAT ||  || align=right | 2.2 km || 
|-id=334 bgcolor=#fefefe
| 586334 ||  || — || October 4, 2002 || Socorro || LINEAR ||  || align=right data-sort-value="0.92" | 920 m || 
|-id=335 bgcolor=#fefefe
| 586335 ||  || — || October 5, 2002 || Palomar || NEAT || H || align=right data-sort-value="0.56" | 560 m || 
|-id=336 bgcolor=#d6d6d6
| 586336 ||  || — || October 5, 2002 || Palomar || NEAT ||  || align=right | 2.8 km || 
|-id=337 bgcolor=#fefefe
| 586337 ||  || — || October 3, 2002 || Palomar || NEAT ||  || align=right data-sort-value="0.97" | 970 m || 
|-id=338 bgcolor=#E9E9E9
| 586338 ||  || — || October 8, 2002 || Palomar || NEAT ||  || align=right | 2.0 km || 
|-id=339 bgcolor=#E9E9E9
| 586339 ||  || — || October 8, 2002 || Palomar || NEAT ||  || align=right | 3.8 km || 
|-id=340 bgcolor=#fefefe
| 586340 ||  || — || October 6, 2002 || Socorro || LINEAR ||  || align=right data-sort-value="0.84" | 840 m || 
|-id=341 bgcolor=#fefefe
| 586341 ||  || — || October 5, 2002 || Socorro || LINEAR ||  || align=right data-sort-value="0.78" | 780 m || 
|-id=342 bgcolor=#E9E9E9
| 586342 ||  || — || October 10, 2002 || Palomar || NEAT ||  || align=right | 2.5 km || 
|-id=343 bgcolor=#fefefe
| 586343 ||  || — || October 13, 2002 || Palomar || NEAT ||  || align=right data-sort-value="0.89" | 890 m || 
|-id=344 bgcolor=#fefefe
| 586344 ||  || — || August 9, 2013 || Kitt Peak || Spacewatch ||  || align=right data-sort-value="0.84" | 840 m || 
|-id=345 bgcolor=#fefefe
| 586345 ||  || — || April 3, 2011 || Haleakala || Pan-STARRS ||  || align=right data-sort-value="0.56" | 560 m || 
|-id=346 bgcolor=#fefefe
| 586346 ||  || — || December 21, 2014 || Haleakala || Pan-STARRS ||  || align=right data-sort-value="0.68" | 680 m || 
|-id=347 bgcolor=#fefefe
| 586347 ||  || — || October 30, 2002 || Haleakala || AMOS ||  || align=right data-sort-value="0.88" | 880 m || 
|-id=348 bgcolor=#E9E9E9
| 586348 ||  || — || October 31, 2002 || Socorro || LINEAR ||  || align=right | 2.5 km || 
|-id=349 bgcolor=#fefefe
| 586349 ||  || — || October 31, 2002 || Palomar || NEAT ||  || align=right | 1.0 km || 
|-id=350 bgcolor=#E9E9E9
| 586350 ||  || — || September 4, 2011 || Haleakala || Pan-STARRS ||  || align=right | 2.1 km || 
|-id=351 bgcolor=#fefefe
| 586351 ||  || — || September 27, 2009 || Mount Lemmon || Mount Lemmon Survey ||  || align=right data-sort-value="0.67" | 670 m || 
|-id=352 bgcolor=#E9E9E9
| 586352 ||  || — || November 9, 2007 || Kitt Peak || Spacewatch ||  || align=right | 1.8 km || 
|-id=353 bgcolor=#d6d6d6
| 586353 ||  || — || November 4, 2002 || Kitt Peak || Spacewatch ||  || align=right | 2.1 km || 
|-id=354 bgcolor=#fefefe
| 586354 ||  || — || November 15, 2002 || Palomar || NEAT ||  || align=right data-sort-value="0.81" | 810 m || 
|-id=355 bgcolor=#fefefe
| 586355 ||  || — || November 16, 2006 || Kitt Peak || Spacewatch ||  || align=right data-sort-value="0.60" | 600 m || 
|-id=356 bgcolor=#fefefe
| 586356 ||  || — || November 13, 2015 || Kitt Peak || Spacewatch ||  || align=right data-sort-value="0.62" | 620 m || 
|-id=357 bgcolor=#d6d6d6
| 586357 ||  || — || November 23, 2002 || Palomar || NEAT ||  || align=right | 2.5 km || 
|-id=358 bgcolor=#fefefe
| 586358 ||  || — || November 24, 2002 || Palomar || NEAT ||  || align=right data-sort-value="0.82" | 820 m || 
|-id=359 bgcolor=#fefefe
| 586359 ||  || — || November 23, 2002 || Palomar || NEAT ||  || align=right data-sort-value="0.70" | 700 m || 
|-id=360 bgcolor=#E9E9E9
| 586360 ||  || — || November 16, 2002 || Palomar || NEAT ||  || align=right | 2.0 km || 
|-id=361 bgcolor=#fefefe
| 586361 ||  || — || November 14, 2002 || Palomar || NEAT ||  || align=right data-sort-value="0.83" | 830 m || 
|-id=362 bgcolor=#d6d6d6
| 586362 ||  || — || February 13, 2008 || Mount Lemmon || Mount Lemmon Survey ||  || align=right | 2.5 km || 
|-id=363 bgcolor=#FA8072
| 586363 ||  || — || November 13, 2002 || Palomar || NEAT ||  || align=right data-sort-value="0.60" | 600 m || 
|-id=364 bgcolor=#fefefe
| 586364 ||  || — || December 11, 2006 || Kitt Peak || Spacewatch ||  || align=right data-sort-value="0.57" | 570 m || 
|-id=365 bgcolor=#fefefe
| 586365 ||  || — || July 3, 2016 || Mount Lemmon || Mount Lemmon Survey ||  || align=right data-sort-value="0.68" | 680 m || 
|-id=366 bgcolor=#E9E9E9
| 586366 ||  || — || August 15, 2013 || Haleakala || Pan-STARRS ||  || align=right data-sort-value="0.73" | 730 m || 
|-id=367 bgcolor=#E9E9E9
| 586367 ||  || — || January 24, 2003 || La Silla || A. Boattini, O. R. Hainaut ||  || align=right | 1.6 km || 
|-id=368 bgcolor=#fefefe
| 586368 ||  || — || February 7, 2003 || Palomar || NEAT ||  || align=right data-sort-value="0.79" | 790 m || 
|-id=369 bgcolor=#E9E9E9
| 586369 ||  || — || December 25, 2010 || Mount Lemmon || Mount Lemmon Survey ||  || align=right data-sort-value="0.79" | 790 m || 
|-id=370 bgcolor=#E9E9E9
| 586370 ||  || — || May 9, 2016 || Mount Lemmon || Mount Lemmon Survey ||  || align=right data-sort-value="0.78" | 780 m || 
|-id=371 bgcolor=#fefefe
| 586371 ||  || — || November 2, 2008 || Mount Lemmon || Mount Lemmon Survey ||  || align=right data-sort-value="0.67" | 670 m || 
|-id=372 bgcolor=#d6d6d6
| 586372 ||  || — || December 30, 2007 || Mount Lemmon || Mount Lemmon Survey ||  || align=right | 2.1 km || 
|-id=373 bgcolor=#d6d6d6
| 586373 ||  || — || July 14, 2015 || Haleakala || Pan-STARRS ||  || align=right | 2.1 km || 
|-id=374 bgcolor=#E9E9E9
| 586374 ||  || — || February 23, 2003 || Campo Imperatore || CINEOS ||  || align=right | 1.6 km || 
|-id=375 bgcolor=#C2FFFF
| 586375 ||  || — || February 28, 2003 || Cerro Tololo || Cerro Tololo Obs. || L4ERY || align=right | 6.7 km || 
|-id=376 bgcolor=#d6d6d6
| 586376 ||  || — || February 9, 2003 || Haleakala || AMOS ||  || align=right | 2.9 km || 
|-id=377 bgcolor=#E9E9E9
| 586377 ||  || — || March 12, 2003 || Kitt Peak || Spacewatch ||  || align=right data-sort-value="0.88" | 880 m || 
|-id=378 bgcolor=#E9E9E9
| 586378 ||  || — || March 11, 2003 || Kitt Peak || Spacewatch ||  || align=right | 1.1 km || 
|-id=379 bgcolor=#E9E9E9
| 586379 ||  || — || October 15, 2001 || Palomar || NEAT ||  || align=right | 1.0 km || 
|-id=380 bgcolor=#E9E9E9
| 586380 ||  || — || March 26, 2003 || Palomar || NEAT ||  || align=right data-sort-value="0.96" | 960 m || 
|-id=381 bgcolor=#fefefe
| 586381 ||  || — || March 31, 2003 || Cerro Tololo || Cerro Tololo Obs. ||  || align=right data-sort-value="0.85" | 850 m || 
|-id=382 bgcolor=#d6d6d6
| 586382 ||  || — || October 12, 2005 || Kitt Peak || Spacewatch ||  || align=right | 3.5 km || 
|-id=383 bgcolor=#d6d6d6
| 586383 ||  || — || February 10, 2008 || Kitt Peak || Spacewatch ||  || align=right | 2.9 km || 
|-id=384 bgcolor=#fefefe
| 586384 ||  || — || July 16, 2004 || Cerro Tololo || Cerro Tololo Obs. ||  || align=right data-sort-value="0.54" | 540 m || 
|-id=385 bgcolor=#fefefe
| 586385 ||  || — || December 25, 1995 || Kitt Peak || Spacewatch ||  || align=right data-sort-value="0.80" | 800 m || 
|-id=386 bgcolor=#C2FFFF
| 586386 ||  || — || December 14, 2010 || Mount Lemmon || Mount Lemmon Survey || L4 || align=right | 8.1 km || 
|-id=387 bgcolor=#d6d6d6
| 586387 ||  || — || August 27, 2005 || Palomar || NEAT ||  || align=right | 2.3 km || 
|-id=388 bgcolor=#fefefe
| 586388 ||  || — || March 24, 2003 || Kitt Peak || Spacewatch ||  || align=right data-sort-value="0.64" | 640 m || 
|-id=389 bgcolor=#E9E9E9
| 586389 ||  || — || March 26, 2003 || Kitt Peak || Spacewatch ||  || align=right data-sort-value="0.99" | 990 m || 
|-id=390 bgcolor=#E9E9E9
| 586390 ||  || — || April 4, 2003 || Kitt Peak || Spacewatch ||  || align=right | 1.3 km || 
|-id=391 bgcolor=#d6d6d6
| 586391 ||  || — || April 9, 2003 || Kitt Peak || Spacewatch ||  || align=right | 1.8 km || 
|-id=392 bgcolor=#C2FFFF
| 586392 ||  || — || September 16, 2009 || Kitt Peak || Spacewatch || L4 || align=right | 9.1 km || 
|-id=393 bgcolor=#C2FFFF
| 586393 ||  || — || April 7, 2003 || Kitt Peak || Spacewatch || L4 || align=right | 12 km || 
|-id=394 bgcolor=#d6d6d6
| 586394 ||  || — || April 29, 2014 || Haleakala || Pan-STARRS ||  || align=right | 2.4 km || 
|-id=395 bgcolor=#E9E9E9
| 586395 ||  || — || November 27, 2013 || Haleakala || Pan-STARRS ||  || align=right | 1.4 km || 
|-id=396 bgcolor=#d6d6d6
| 586396 ||  || — || October 20, 2011 || Catalina || CSS ||  || align=right | 2.7 km || 
|-id=397 bgcolor=#fefefe
| 586397 ||  || — || April 10, 2010 || Mount Lemmon || Mount Lemmon Survey ||  || align=right data-sort-value="0.64" | 640 m || 
|-id=398 bgcolor=#E9E9E9
| 586398 ||  || — || October 5, 2013 || Haleakala || Pan-STARRS ||  || align=right | 2.1 km || 
|-id=399 bgcolor=#fefefe
| 586399 ||  || — || July 25, 2014 || Haleakala || Pan-STARRS ||  || align=right data-sort-value="0.52" | 520 m || 
|-id=400 bgcolor=#E9E9E9
| 586400 ||  || — || December 7, 2005 || Kitt Peak || Spacewatch ||  || align=right | 1.0 km || 
|}

586401–586500 

|-bgcolor=#E9E9E9
| 586401 ||  || — || March 25, 2003 || Palomar || NEAT ||  || align=right | 1.2 km || 
|-id=402 bgcolor=#d6d6d6
| 586402 ||  || — || February 8, 2008 || Mount Lemmon || Mount Lemmon Survey ||  || align=right | 2.1 km || 
|-id=403 bgcolor=#d6d6d6
| 586403 ||  || — || February 9, 2008 || Mount Lemmon || Mount Lemmon Survey ||  || align=right | 2.1 km || 
|-id=404 bgcolor=#E9E9E9
| 586404 ||  || — || October 24, 2013 || Mount Lemmon || Mount Lemmon Survey ||  || align=right data-sort-value="0.71" | 710 m || 
|-id=405 bgcolor=#fefefe
| 586405 ||  || — || April 8, 2003 || Kitt Peak || Spacewatch ||  || align=right data-sort-value="0.56" | 560 m || 
|-id=406 bgcolor=#d6d6d6
| 586406 ||  || — || April 29, 2003 || Kitt Peak || Spacewatch ||  || align=right | 2.5 km || 
|-id=407 bgcolor=#E9E9E9
| 586407 ||  || — || September 17, 2013 || Mount Lemmon || Mount Lemmon Survey ||  || align=right | 1.0 km || 
|-id=408 bgcolor=#E9E9E9
| 586408 ||  || — || April 25, 2003 || Kitt Peak || Spacewatch ||  || align=right | 1.6 km || 
|-id=409 bgcolor=#E9E9E9
| 586409 ||  || — || January 25, 2015 || Haleakala || Pan-STARRS ||  || align=right | 1.2 km || 
|-id=410 bgcolor=#C2FFFF
| 586410 ||  || — || May 20, 2004 || Kitt Peak || Spacewatch || L4 || align=right | 11 km || 
|-id=411 bgcolor=#d6d6d6
| 586411 ||  || — || April 24, 2003 || Kitt Peak || Spacewatch ||  || align=right | 3.2 km || 
|-id=412 bgcolor=#E9E9E9
| 586412 ||  || — || April 30, 2003 || Kitt Peak || Spacewatch ||  || align=right data-sort-value="0.98" | 980 m || 
|-id=413 bgcolor=#E9E9E9
| 586413 ||  || — || May 1, 2003 || Kitt Peak || Spacewatch ||  || align=right | 1.4 km || 
|-id=414 bgcolor=#d6d6d6
| 586414 ||  || — || May 2, 2003 || Kitt Peak || Spacewatch ||  || align=right | 2.7 km || 
|-id=415 bgcolor=#d6d6d6
| 586415 ||  || — || May 2, 2003 || Kitt Peak || Spacewatch ||  || align=right | 3.2 km || 
|-id=416 bgcolor=#d6d6d6
| 586416 ||  || — || September 13, 2005 || Kitt Peak || Spacewatch ||  || align=right | 2.5 km || 
|-id=417 bgcolor=#E9E9E9
| 586417 ||  || — || November 8, 2013 || Mount Lemmon || Mount Lemmon Survey ||  || align=right data-sort-value="0.80" | 800 m || 
|-id=418 bgcolor=#d6d6d6
| 586418 ||  || — || May 22, 2003 || Kitt Peak || Spacewatch ||  || align=right | 2.6 km || 
|-id=419 bgcolor=#d6d6d6
| 586419 ||  || — || May 22, 2003 || Kitt Peak || Spacewatch ||  || align=right | 2.4 km || 
|-id=420 bgcolor=#d6d6d6
| 586420 ||  || — || May 26, 2003 || Kitt Peak || Spacewatch ||  || align=right | 3.0 km || 
|-id=421 bgcolor=#E9E9E9
| 586421 ||  || — || May 22, 2003 || Kitt Peak || Spacewatch ||  || align=right | 1.2 km || 
|-id=422 bgcolor=#fefefe
| 586422 ||  || — || May 24, 2003 || Nogales || P. R. Holvorcem, M. Schwartz ||  || align=right data-sort-value="0.62" | 620 m || 
|-id=423 bgcolor=#d6d6d6
| 586423 ||  || — || May 27, 2003 || Kitt Peak || Spacewatch ||  || align=right | 2.4 km || 
|-id=424 bgcolor=#d6d6d6
| 586424 ||  || — || April 29, 2014 || Haleakala || Pan-STARRS ||  || align=right | 2.2 km || 
|-id=425 bgcolor=#fefefe
| 586425 ||  || — || June 3, 2003 || Kitt Peak || Spacewatch || H || align=right data-sort-value="0.48" | 480 m || 
|-id=426 bgcolor=#d6d6d6
| 586426 ||  || — || January 27, 2007 || Mount Lemmon || Mount Lemmon Survey ||  || align=right | 3.0 km || 
|-id=427 bgcolor=#E9E9E9
| 586427 ||  || — || September 17, 2009 || Mount Lemmon || Mount Lemmon Survey ||  || align=right | 1.6 km || 
|-id=428 bgcolor=#E9E9E9
| 586428 ||  || — || October 10, 2008 || Kitt Peak || Spacewatch ||  || align=right | 1.2 km || 
|-id=429 bgcolor=#d6d6d6
| 586429 ||  || — || October 28, 2011 || Mount Lemmon || Mount Lemmon Survey ||  || align=right | 2.5 km || 
|-id=430 bgcolor=#fefefe
| 586430 ||  || — || October 10, 2010 || Kitt Peak || Spacewatch ||  || align=right data-sort-value="0.64" | 640 m || 
|-id=431 bgcolor=#fefefe
| 586431 ||  || — || July 8, 2003 || Palomar || NEAT || H || align=right data-sort-value="0.52" | 520 m || 
|-id=432 bgcolor=#fefefe
| 586432 ||  || — || August 20, 2003 || Campo Imperatore || CINEOS ||  || align=right data-sort-value="0.74" | 740 m || 
|-id=433 bgcolor=#d6d6d6
| 586433 ||  || — || August 24, 2003 || Cerro Tololo || Cerro Tololo Obs. ||  || align=right | 2.6 km || 
|-id=434 bgcolor=#d6d6d6
| 586434 ||  || — || August 25, 2003 || Cerro Tololo || Cerro Tololo Obs. ||  || align=right | 2.6 km || 
|-id=435 bgcolor=#E9E9E9
| 586435 ||  || — || July 7, 2003 || Palomar || NEAT ||  || align=right | 1.9 km || 
|-id=436 bgcolor=#E9E9E9
| 586436 ||  || — || August 26, 2003 || Cerro Tololo || Cerro Tololo Obs. ||  || align=right | 1.4 km || 
|-id=437 bgcolor=#fefefe
| 586437 ||  || — || August 25, 2003 || Cerro Tololo || Cerro Tololo Obs. ||  || align=right data-sort-value="0.72" | 720 m || 
|-id=438 bgcolor=#fefefe
| 586438 ||  || — || September 22, 2014 || Haleakala || Pan-STARRS ||  || align=right data-sort-value="0.49" | 490 m || 
|-id=439 bgcolor=#fefefe
| 586439 ||  || — || February 3, 2009 || Mount Lemmon || Mount Lemmon Survey ||  || align=right data-sort-value="0.62" | 620 m || 
|-id=440 bgcolor=#fefefe
| 586440 ||  || — || January 30, 2009 || Mount Lemmon || Mount Lemmon Survey ||  || align=right data-sort-value="0.61" | 610 m || 
|-id=441 bgcolor=#fefefe
| 586441 ||  || — || September 4, 2003 || Kitt Peak || Spacewatch ||  || align=right data-sort-value="0.61" | 610 m || 
|-id=442 bgcolor=#fefefe
| 586442 ||  || — || September 18, 2003 || Palomar || NEAT ||  || align=right data-sort-value="0.78" | 780 m || 
|-id=443 bgcolor=#fefefe
| 586443 ||  || — || September 18, 2003 || Kitt Peak || Spacewatch ||  || align=right data-sort-value="0.59" | 590 m || 
|-id=444 bgcolor=#fefefe
| 586444 ||  || — || September 18, 2003 || Palomar || NEAT ||  || align=right data-sort-value="0.88" | 880 m || 
|-id=445 bgcolor=#E9E9E9
| 586445 ||  || — || August 23, 2003 || Palomar || NEAT ||  || align=right | 2.1 km || 
|-id=446 bgcolor=#E9E9E9
| 586446 ||  || — || September 19, 2003 || Kitt Peak || Spacewatch ||  || align=right | 1.7 km || 
|-id=447 bgcolor=#E9E9E9
| 586447 ||  || — || September 16, 2003 || Palomar || NEAT ||  || align=right | 2.0 km || 
|-id=448 bgcolor=#fefefe
| 586448 ||  || — || September 20, 2003 || Palomar || NEAT || H || align=right data-sort-value="0.53" | 530 m || 
|-id=449 bgcolor=#E9E9E9
| 586449 ||  || — || September 18, 2003 || Palomar || NEAT ||  || align=right | 1.7 km || 
|-id=450 bgcolor=#E9E9E9
| 586450 ||  || — || September 16, 2003 || Kitt Peak || Spacewatch ||  || align=right | 1.6 km || 
|-id=451 bgcolor=#FA8072
| 586451 ||  || — || September 19, 2003 || Palomar || NEAT || H || align=right data-sort-value="0.61" | 610 m || 
|-id=452 bgcolor=#E9E9E9
| 586452 ||  || — || September 28, 2003 || Anderson Mesa || LONEOS ||  || align=right | 2.2 km || 
|-id=453 bgcolor=#fefefe
| 586453 ||  || — || September 28, 2003 || Anderson Mesa || LONEOS ||  || align=right | 1.2 km || 
|-id=454 bgcolor=#E9E9E9
| 586454 ||  || — || September 26, 2003 || Apache Point || SDSS Collaboration ||  || align=right | 2.6 km || 
|-id=455 bgcolor=#d6d6d6
| 586455 ||  || — || September 26, 2003 || Apache Point || SDSS Collaboration ||  || align=right | 2.3 km || 
|-id=456 bgcolor=#E9E9E9
| 586456 ||  || — || September 20, 2003 || Kitt Peak || Spacewatch ||  || align=right | 1.9 km || 
|-id=457 bgcolor=#E9E9E9
| 586457 ||  || — || September 21, 2003 || Kitt Peak || Spacewatch ||  || align=right | 1.4 km || 
|-id=458 bgcolor=#fefefe
| 586458 ||  || — || September 22, 2003 || Kitt Peak || Spacewatch ||  || align=right data-sort-value="0.68" | 680 m || 
|-id=459 bgcolor=#E9E9E9
| 586459 ||  || — || September 22, 2003 || Kitt Peak || Spacewatch ||  || align=right | 1.1 km || 
|-id=460 bgcolor=#fefefe
| 586460 ||  || — || September 16, 2003 || Kitt Peak || Spacewatch ||  || align=right data-sort-value="0.61" | 610 m || 
|-id=461 bgcolor=#E9E9E9
| 586461 ||  || — || September 19, 2003 || Kitt Peak || Spacewatch ||  || align=right | 1.2 km || 
|-id=462 bgcolor=#E9E9E9
| 586462 ||  || — || September 26, 2003 || Apache Point || SDSS Collaboration ||  || align=right | 1.7 km || 
|-id=463 bgcolor=#d6d6d6
| 586463 ||  || — || September 26, 2003 || Apache Point || SDSS Collaboration ||  || align=right | 2.2 km || 
|-id=464 bgcolor=#E9E9E9
| 586464 ||  || — || September 26, 2003 || Apache Point || SDSS Collaboration ||  || align=right | 1.7 km || 
|-id=465 bgcolor=#d6d6d6
| 586465 ||  || — || September 26, 2003 || Apache Point || SDSS Collaboration ||  || align=right | 2.2 km || 
|-id=466 bgcolor=#fefefe
| 586466 ||  || — || October 2, 2003 || Kitt Peak || Spacewatch ||  || align=right data-sort-value="0.59" | 590 m || 
|-id=467 bgcolor=#E9E9E9
| 586467 ||  || — || September 26, 2003 || Apache Point || SDSS Collaboration ||  || align=right | 1.6 km || 
|-id=468 bgcolor=#E9E9E9
| 586468 ||  || — || September 26, 2003 || Apache Point || SDSS Collaboration ||  || align=right | 1.4 km || 
|-id=469 bgcolor=#E9E9E9
| 586469 ||  || — || September 26, 2003 || Apache Point || SDSS Collaboration ||  || align=right | 2.1 km || 
|-id=470 bgcolor=#E9E9E9
| 586470 ||  || — || September 26, 2003 || Apache Point || SDSS Collaboration ||  || align=right | 1.9 km || 
|-id=471 bgcolor=#E9E9E9
| 586471 ||  || — || September 26, 2003 || Apache Point || SDSS Collaboration ||  || align=right | 1.9 km || 
|-id=472 bgcolor=#E9E9E9
| 586472 ||  || — || March 8, 2005 || Catalina || CSS ||  || align=right | 2.5 km || 
|-id=473 bgcolor=#fefefe
| 586473 ||  || — || March 11, 2005 || Catalina || CSS ||  || align=right data-sort-value="0.98" | 980 m || 
|-id=474 bgcolor=#E9E9E9
| 586474 ||  || — || September 27, 2003 || Apache Point || SDSS Collaboration ||  || align=right | 2.1 km || 
|-id=475 bgcolor=#E9E9E9
| 586475 ||  || — || September 27, 2003 || Apache Point || SDSS Collaboration ||  || align=right | 1.9 km || 
|-id=476 bgcolor=#d6d6d6
| 586476 ||  || — || September 28, 2003 || Kitt Peak || Spacewatch ||  || align=right | 4.5 km || 
|-id=477 bgcolor=#E9E9E9
| 586477 ||  || — || September 29, 2003 || Kitt Peak || Spacewatch ||  || align=right | 1.9 km || 
|-id=478 bgcolor=#fefefe
| 586478 ||  || — || September 28, 2003 || Apache Point || SDSS Collaboration ||  || align=right data-sort-value="0.68" | 680 m || 
|-id=479 bgcolor=#E9E9E9
| 586479 ||  || — || September 29, 2003 || Apache Point || SDSS Collaboration ||  || align=right | 2.0 km || 
|-id=480 bgcolor=#E9E9E9
| 586480 ||  || — || September 25, 2003 || Haleakala || AMOS ||  || align=right | 2.1 km || 
|-id=481 bgcolor=#E9E9E9
| 586481 ||  || — || September 30, 2003 || Kitt Peak || Spacewatch ||  || align=right | 2.0 km || 
|-id=482 bgcolor=#E9E9E9
| 586482 ||  || — || September 22, 2003 || Kitt Peak || Spacewatch ||  || align=right | 1.9 km || 
|-id=483 bgcolor=#E9E9E9
| 586483 ||  || — || November 17, 2008 || Kitt Peak || Spacewatch ||  || align=right | 1.4 km || 
|-id=484 bgcolor=#fefefe
| 586484 ||  || — || November 9, 2007 || Mount Lemmon || Mount Lemmon Survey ||  || align=right data-sort-value="0.63" | 630 m || 
|-id=485 bgcolor=#E9E9E9
| 586485 ||  || — || February 13, 2010 || Mount Lemmon || Mount Lemmon Survey ||  || align=right | 1.6 km || 
|-id=486 bgcolor=#E9E9E9
| 586486 ||  || — || November 20, 2008 || Mount Lemmon || Mount Lemmon Survey ||  || align=right | 1.5 km || 
|-id=487 bgcolor=#fefefe
| 586487 ||  || — || September 29, 2003 || Kitt Peak || Spacewatch ||  || align=right data-sort-value="0.57" | 570 m || 
|-id=488 bgcolor=#fefefe
| 586488 ||  || — || February 1, 2012 || Mount Lemmon || Mount Lemmon Survey ||  || align=right data-sort-value="0.60" | 600 m || 
|-id=489 bgcolor=#E9E9E9
| 586489 ||  || — || August 7, 2016 || Haleakala || Pan-STARRS ||  || align=right | 2.1 km || 
|-id=490 bgcolor=#E9E9E9
| 586490 ||  || — || October 27, 2008 || Mount Lemmon || Mount Lemmon Survey ||  || align=right | 1.3 km || 
|-id=491 bgcolor=#d6d6d6
| 586491 ||  || — || January 21, 2012 || Kitt Peak || Spacewatch ||  || align=right | 2.6 km || 
|-id=492 bgcolor=#fefefe
| 586492 ||  || — || February 27, 2012 || Haleakala || Pan-STARRS ||  || align=right data-sort-value="0.71" | 710 m || 
|-id=493 bgcolor=#E9E9E9
| 586493 ||  || — || October 8, 2008 || Mount Lemmon || Mount Lemmon Survey ||  || align=right | 1.7 km || 
|-id=494 bgcolor=#d6d6d6
| 586494 ||  || — || February 4, 2006 || Mount Lemmon || Mount Lemmon Survey ||  || align=right | 2.5 km || 
|-id=495 bgcolor=#FA8072
| 586495 ||  || — || September 19, 2003 || Kitt Peak || Spacewatch ||  || align=right data-sort-value="0.50" | 500 m || 
|-id=496 bgcolor=#E9E9E9
| 586496 ||  || — || September 30, 2003 || Kitt Peak || Spacewatch ||  || align=right | 1.9 km || 
|-id=497 bgcolor=#fefefe
| 586497 ||  || — || March 10, 2005 || Mount Lemmon || Mount Lemmon Survey ||  || align=right data-sort-value="0.50" | 500 m || 
|-id=498 bgcolor=#fefefe
| 586498 ||  || — || September 28, 2003 || Kitt Peak || Spacewatch ||  || align=right data-sort-value="0.52" | 520 m || 
|-id=499 bgcolor=#E9E9E9
| 586499 ||  || — || September 18, 2003 || Kitt Peak || Spacewatch ||  || align=right | 1.6 km || 
|-id=500 bgcolor=#E9E9E9
| 586500 ||  || — || September 30, 2003 || Kitt Peak || Spacewatch ||  || align=right | 1.3 km || 
|}

586501–586600 

|-bgcolor=#d6d6d6
| 586501 ||  || — || October 2, 2003 || Kitt Peak || Spacewatch ||  || align=right | 2.8 km || 
|-id=502 bgcolor=#fefefe
| 586502 ||  || — || October 15, 2003 || Sandlot || G. Hug ||  || align=right data-sort-value="0.71" | 710 m || 
|-id=503 bgcolor=#fefefe
| 586503 ||  || — || October 1, 2003 || Kitt Peak || Spacewatch ||  || align=right data-sort-value="0.83" | 830 m || 
|-id=504 bgcolor=#E9E9E9
| 586504 ||  || — || September 16, 2003 || Kitt Peak || Spacewatch ||  || align=right | 1.4 km || 
|-id=505 bgcolor=#fefefe
| 586505 ||  || — || October 2, 2003 || Kitt Peak || Spacewatch ||  || align=right data-sort-value="0.54" | 540 m || 
|-id=506 bgcolor=#E9E9E9
| 586506 ||  || — || February 18, 2014 || Mount Lemmon || Mount Lemmon Survey ||  || align=right | 1.5 km || 
|-id=507 bgcolor=#E9E9E9
| 586507 ||  || — || October 1, 2003 || Kitt Peak || Spacewatch ||  || align=right | 1.8 km || 
|-id=508 bgcolor=#fefefe
| 586508 ||  || — || October 17, 2003 || Kitt Peak || Spacewatch || H || align=right data-sort-value="0.48" | 480 m || 
|-id=509 bgcolor=#d6d6d6
| 586509 ||  || — || October 18, 2003 || Kitt Peak || Spacewatch ||  || align=right | 1.7 km || 
|-id=510 bgcolor=#fefefe
| 586510 ||  || — || September 28, 2003 || Kitt Peak || Spacewatch ||  || align=right data-sort-value="0.54" | 540 m || 
|-id=511 bgcolor=#d6d6d6
| 586511 ||  || — || October 1, 2003 || Kitt Peak || Spacewatch ||  || align=right | 1.9 km || 
|-id=512 bgcolor=#E9E9E9
| 586512 ||  || — || October 20, 2003 || Palomar || NEAT ||  || align=right | 2.1 km || 
|-id=513 bgcolor=#E9E9E9
| 586513 ||  || — || September 28, 2003 || Socorro || LINEAR ||  || align=right | 1.8 km || 
|-id=514 bgcolor=#E9E9E9
| 586514 ||  || — || October 19, 2003 || Palomar || NEAT ||  || align=right | 2.8 km || 
|-id=515 bgcolor=#E9E9E9
| 586515 ||  || — || October 16, 2003 || Anderson Mesa || LONEOS ||  || align=right | 1.9 km || 
|-id=516 bgcolor=#E9E9E9
| 586516 ||  || — || October 21, 2003 || Palomar || NEAT ||  || align=right | 2.6 km || 
|-id=517 bgcolor=#E9E9E9
| 586517 ||  || — || September 22, 2003 || Kitt Peak || Spacewatch ||  || align=right | 1.8 km || 
|-id=518 bgcolor=#E9E9E9
| 586518 ||  || — || September 28, 2003 || Kitt Peak || Spacewatch ||  || align=right | 1.3 km || 
|-id=519 bgcolor=#E9E9E9
| 586519 ||  || — || September 27, 2003 || Kitt Peak || Spacewatch ||  || align=right | 1.7 km || 
|-id=520 bgcolor=#E9E9E9
| 586520 ||  || — || October 20, 2003 || Kitt Peak || Spacewatch ||  || align=right | 2.3 km || 
|-id=521 bgcolor=#E9E9E9
| 586521 ||  || — || October 19, 2003 || Haleakala || AMOS ||  || align=right | 2.3 km || 
|-id=522 bgcolor=#d6d6d6
| 586522 ||  || — || October 18, 2003 || Kitt Peak || Spacewatch ||  || align=right | 2.3 km || 
|-id=523 bgcolor=#E9E9E9
| 586523 ||  || — || September 16, 2003 || Kitt Peak || Spacewatch ||  || align=right | 1.3 km || 
|-id=524 bgcolor=#E9E9E9
| 586524 ||  || — || September 29, 2003 || Kitt Peak || Spacewatch ||  || align=right | 1.8 km || 
|-id=525 bgcolor=#fefefe
| 586525 ||  || — || May 11, 2005 || Mount Lemmon || Mount Lemmon Survey ||  || align=right data-sort-value="0.75" | 750 m || 
|-id=526 bgcolor=#E9E9E9
| 586526 ||  || — || October 19, 2003 || Apache Point || SDSS Collaboration ||  || align=right | 1.1 km || 
|-id=527 bgcolor=#fefefe
| 586527 ||  || — || May 7, 2005 || Kitt Peak || Spacewatch ||  || align=right data-sort-value="0.71" | 710 m || 
|-id=528 bgcolor=#fefefe
| 586528 ||  || — || October 20, 2003 || Kitt Peak || Spacewatch ||  || align=right data-sort-value="0.92" | 920 m || 
|-id=529 bgcolor=#E9E9E9
| 586529 ||  || — || September 27, 2003 || Kitt Peak || Spacewatch ||  || align=right | 1.5 km || 
|-id=530 bgcolor=#E9E9E9
| 586530 ||  || — || October 22, 2003 || Kitt Peak || Spacewatch ||  || align=right | 1.3 km || 
|-id=531 bgcolor=#E9E9E9
| 586531 ||  || — || October 22, 2003 || Apache Point || SDSS Collaboration ||  || align=right | 1.7 km || 
|-id=532 bgcolor=#E9E9E9
| 586532 ||  || — || January 13, 2005 || Kitt Peak || Spacewatch || HOF || align=right | 2.4 km || 
|-id=533 bgcolor=#E9E9E9
| 586533 ||  || — || October 25, 2003 || Kitt Peak || Spacewatch ||  || align=right | 2.1 km || 
|-id=534 bgcolor=#fefefe
| 586534 ||  || — || October 19, 2003 || Apache Point || SDSS Collaboration ||  || align=right data-sort-value="0.54" | 540 m || 
|-id=535 bgcolor=#E9E9E9
| 586535 ||  || — || October 21, 2003 || Kitt Peak || Spacewatch ||  || align=right | 3.0 km || 
|-id=536 bgcolor=#E9E9E9
| 586536 ||  || — || October 10, 2012 || Mount Lemmon || Mount Lemmon Survey ||  || align=right | 1.9 km || 
|-id=537 bgcolor=#E9E9E9
| 586537 ||  || — || January 16, 2005 || Kitt Peak || Spacewatch ||  || align=right | 1.9 km || 
|-id=538 bgcolor=#E9E9E9
| 586538 ||  || — || October 22, 2003 || Apache Point || SDSS Collaboration ||  || align=right | 2.2 km || 
|-id=539 bgcolor=#E9E9E9
| 586539 ||  || — || October 18, 2003 || Kitt Peak || Spacewatch ||  || align=right | 1.7 km || 
|-id=540 bgcolor=#E9E9E9
| 586540 ||  || — || October 21, 2003 || Kitt Peak || Spacewatch ||  || align=right | 2.0 km || 
|-id=541 bgcolor=#E9E9E9
| 586541 ||  || — || October 23, 2008 || Kitt Peak || Spacewatch ||  || align=right | 1.8 km || 
|-id=542 bgcolor=#fefefe
| 586542 ||  || — || October 22, 2003 || Kitt Peak || Spacewatch ||  || align=right data-sort-value="0.62" | 620 m || 
|-id=543 bgcolor=#E9E9E9
| 586543 ||  || — || November 19, 2003 || Kitt Peak || Spacewatch ||  || align=right | 1.8 km || 
|-id=544 bgcolor=#fefefe
| 586544 ||  || — || October 19, 2003 || Kitt Peak || Spacewatch ||  || align=right data-sort-value="0.64" | 640 m || 
|-id=545 bgcolor=#E9E9E9
| 586545 ||  || — || December 30, 2008 || Kitt Peak || Spacewatch ||  || align=right | 1.3 km || 
|-id=546 bgcolor=#E9E9E9
| 586546 ||  || — || October 6, 2012 || Haleakala || Pan-STARRS ||  || align=right | 1.9 km || 
|-id=547 bgcolor=#d6d6d6
| 586547 ||  || — || October 17, 2003 || Apache Point || SDSS Collaboration ||  || align=right | 3.3 km || 
|-id=548 bgcolor=#fefefe
| 586548 ||  || — || April 24, 2006 || Kitt Peak || Spacewatch ||  || align=right data-sort-value="0.62" | 620 m || 
|-id=549 bgcolor=#E9E9E9
| 586549 ||  || — || December 31, 2013 || Kitt Peak || Spacewatch ||  || align=right | 1.7 km || 
|-id=550 bgcolor=#d6d6d6
| 586550 ||  || — || October 7, 2013 || Kitt Peak || Spacewatch ||  || align=right | 2.0 km || 
|-id=551 bgcolor=#E9E9E9
| 586551 ||  || — || October 7, 2012 || Haleakala || Pan-STARRS ||  || align=right | 1.5 km || 
|-id=552 bgcolor=#E9E9E9
| 586552 ||  || — || February 17, 2010 || Kitt Peak || Spacewatch ||  || align=right | 1.6 km || 
|-id=553 bgcolor=#E9E9E9
| 586553 ||  || — || January 28, 2014 || Mount Lemmon || Mount Lemmon Survey ||  || align=right | 1.3 km || 
|-id=554 bgcolor=#d6d6d6
| 586554 ||  || — || July 25, 2015 || Haleakala || Pan-STARRS ||  || align=right | 2.7 km || 
|-id=555 bgcolor=#E9E9E9
| 586555 ||  || — || February 26, 2014 || Haleakala || Pan-STARRS ||  || align=right | 1.4 km || 
|-id=556 bgcolor=#E9E9E9
| 586556 ||  || — || January 21, 2014 || Kitt Peak || Spacewatch ||  || align=right | 2.0 km || 
|-id=557 bgcolor=#fefefe
| 586557 ||  || — || February 21, 2009 || Kitt Peak || Spacewatch ||  || align=right data-sort-value="0.80" | 800 m || 
|-id=558 bgcolor=#fefefe
| 586558 ||  || — || October 20, 2003 || Kitt Peak || Spacewatch ||  || align=right data-sort-value="0.77" | 770 m || 
|-id=559 bgcolor=#E9E9E9
| 586559 ||  || — || January 16, 2013 || Haleakala || Pan-STARRS ||  || align=right data-sort-value="0.99" | 990 m || 
|-id=560 bgcolor=#E9E9E9
| 586560 ||  || — || October 23, 2003 || Kitt Peak || Spacewatch ||  || align=right | 1.5 km || 
|-id=561 bgcolor=#E9E9E9
| 586561 ||  || — || October 19, 2003 || Apache Point || SDSS Collaboration ||  || align=right | 1.7 km || 
|-id=562 bgcolor=#E9E9E9
| 586562 ||  || — || October 20, 2003 || Kitt Peak || Spacewatch ||  || align=right | 1.9 km || 
|-id=563 bgcolor=#fefefe
| 586563 ||  || — || November 18, 2003 || Kitt Peak || Spacewatch ||  || align=right data-sort-value="0.80" | 800 m || 
|-id=564 bgcolor=#fefefe
| 586564 ||  || — || November 16, 2003 || Kitt Peak || Spacewatch ||  || align=right data-sort-value="0.80" | 800 m || 
|-id=565 bgcolor=#fefefe
| 586565 ||  || — || November 21, 2003 || Palomar || NEAT ||  || align=right data-sort-value="0.73" | 730 m || 
|-id=566 bgcolor=#d6d6d6
| 586566 ||  || — || November 30, 2003 || Kitt Peak || Spacewatch ||  || align=right | 2.3 km || 
|-id=567 bgcolor=#E9E9E9
| 586567 ||  || — || October 19, 2003 || Kitt Peak || Spacewatch ||  || align=right data-sort-value="0.44" | 440 m || 
|-id=568 bgcolor=#E9E9E9
| 586568 ||  || — || November 2, 2003 || Kitt Peak || Spacewatch ||  || align=right | 1.5 km || 
|-id=569 bgcolor=#fefefe
| 586569 ||  || — || November 23, 2003 || Kitt Peak || Kitt Peak Obs. ||  || align=right data-sort-value="0.58" | 580 m || 
|-id=570 bgcolor=#E9E9E9
| 586570 ||  || — || January 18, 2005 || Kitt Peak || Spacewatch ||  || align=right | 2.2 km || 
|-id=571 bgcolor=#fefefe
| 586571 ||  || — || February 16, 2012 || Haleakala || Pan-STARRS ||  || align=right data-sort-value="0.76" | 760 m || 
|-id=572 bgcolor=#E9E9E9
| 586572 ||  || — || January 1, 2014 || Haleakala || Pan-STARRS ||  || align=right | 1.9 km || 
|-id=573 bgcolor=#E9E9E9
| 586573 ||  || — || November 30, 2003 || Kitt Peak || Spacewatch ||  || align=right | 2.1 km || 
|-id=574 bgcolor=#d6d6d6
| 586574 ||  || — || January 7, 2014 || Kitt Peak || Spacewatch ||  || align=right | 1.9 km || 
|-id=575 bgcolor=#fefefe
| 586575 ||  || — || March 9, 2005 || Mount Lemmon || Mount Lemmon Survey ||  || align=right data-sort-value="0.65" | 650 m || 
|-id=576 bgcolor=#E9E9E9
| 586576 ||  || — || September 25, 2012 || Kitt Peak || Spacewatch ||  || align=right | 1.7 km || 
|-id=577 bgcolor=#fefefe
| 586577 ||  || — || April 2, 2009 || Kitt Peak || Spacewatch ||  || align=right data-sort-value="0.63" | 630 m || 
|-id=578 bgcolor=#E9E9E9
| 586578 ||  || — || March 17, 2005 || Campo Imperatore || R. Leoni ||  || align=right | 2.1 km || 
|-id=579 bgcolor=#fefefe
| 586579 ||  || — || November 24, 2003 || Kitt Peak || Spacewatch ||  || align=right data-sort-value="0.68" | 680 m || 
|-id=580 bgcolor=#E9E9E9
| 586580 ||  || — || December 8, 2012 || Mount Lemmon || Mount Lemmon Survey ||  || align=right | 1.2 km || 
|-id=581 bgcolor=#fefefe
| 586581 ||  || — || March 28, 2016 || Cerro Tololo-DECam || CTIO-DECam ||  || align=right data-sort-value="0.60" | 600 m || 
|-id=582 bgcolor=#E9E9E9
| 586582 ||  || — || January 1, 2014 || Kitt Peak || Spacewatch ||  || align=right | 1.8 km || 
|-id=583 bgcolor=#fefefe
| 586583 ||  || — || November 26, 2003 || Kitt Peak || Spacewatch ||  || align=right data-sort-value="0.52" | 520 m || 
|-id=584 bgcolor=#fefefe
| 586584 ||  || — || November 30, 2003 || Kitt Peak || Spacewatch ||  || align=right data-sort-value="0.74" | 740 m || 
|-id=585 bgcolor=#E9E9E9
| 586585 ||  || — || December 1, 2003 || Kitt Peak || Spacewatch ||  || align=right | 2.4 km || 
|-id=586 bgcolor=#fefefe
| 586586 ||  || — || September 14, 2010 || Mount Lemmon || Mount Lemmon Survey ||  || align=right data-sort-value="0.68" | 680 m || 
|-id=587 bgcolor=#E9E9E9
| 586587 ||  || — || November 21, 2017 || Mount Lemmon || Mount Lemmon Survey ||  || align=right | 2.1 km || 
|-id=588 bgcolor=#d6d6d6
| 586588 ||  || — || May 23, 2012 || Mount Lemmon || Mount Lemmon Survey ||  || align=right | 2.5 km || 
|-id=589 bgcolor=#E9E9E9
| 586589 ||  || — || December 19, 2003 || Kitt Peak || Spacewatch ||  || align=right | 2.1 km || 
|-id=590 bgcolor=#E9E9E9
| 586590 ||  || — || December 19, 2003 || Kitt Peak || Spacewatch ||  || align=right | 2.5 km || 
|-id=591 bgcolor=#E9E9E9
| 586591 ||  || — || December 19, 2003 || Kitt Peak || Spacewatch ||  || align=right | 2.0 km || 
|-id=592 bgcolor=#E9E9E9
| 586592 ||  || — || January 15, 2004 || Kitt Peak || Spacewatch ||  || align=right | 2.1 km || 
|-id=593 bgcolor=#fefefe
| 586593 ||  || — || February 7, 2008 || Kitt Peak || Spacewatch ||  || align=right data-sort-value="0.70" | 700 m || 
|-id=594 bgcolor=#E9E9E9
| 586594 ||  || — || November 14, 2012 || Kitt Peak || Spacewatch ||  || align=right | 1.9 km || 
|-id=595 bgcolor=#E9E9E9
| 586595 ||  || — || September 14, 2007 || Kitt Peak || Spacewatch ||  || align=right | 1.9 km || 
|-id=596 bgcolor=#E9E9E9
| 586596 ||  || — || November 3, 2007 || Mount Lemmon || Mount Lemmon Survey ||  || align=right | 1.6 km || 
|-id=597 bgcolor=#fefefe
| 586597 ||  || — || December 19, 2007 || Mount Lemmon || Mount Lemmon Survey ||  || align=right data-sort-value="0.76" | 760 m || 
|-id=598 bgcolor=#E9E9E9
| 586598 ||  || — || February 18, 2014 || Mount Lemmon || Mount Lemmon Survey ||  || align=right | 1.8 km || 
|-id=599 bgcolor=#fefefe
| 586599 ||  || — || March 24, 2009 || Mount Lemmon || Mount Lemmon Survey ||  || align=right data-sort-value="0.74" | 740 m || 
|-id=600 bgcolor=#fefefe
| 586600 ||  || — || January 13, 2004 || Kitt Peak || Spacewatch ||  || align=right data-sort-value="0.70" | 700 m || 
|}

586601–586700 

|-bgcolor=#fefefe
| 586601 ||  || — || January 16, 2004 || Kitt Peak || Spacewatch ||  || align=right data-sort-value="0.58" | 580 m || 
|-id=602 bgcolor=#E9E9E9
| 586602 ||  || — || January 16, 2004 || Kitt Peak || Spacewatch ||  || align=right | 1.7 km || 
|-id=603 bgcolor=#fefefe
| 586603 ||  || — || January 16, 2004 || Kitt Peak || Spacewatch ||  || align=right data-sort-value="0.56" | 560 m || 
|-id=604 bgcolor=#d6d6d6
| 586604 ||  || — || August 30, 2016 || Haleakala || Pan-STARRS ||  || align=right | 2.4 km || 
|-id=605 bgcolor=#d6d6d6
| 586605 ||  || — || September 2, 2011 || Haleakala || Pan-STARRS ||  || align=right | 2.0 km || 
|-id=606 bgcolor=#E9E9E9
| 586606 ||  || — || October 30, 2007 || Kitt Peak || Spacewatch ||  || align=right | 2.0 km || 
|-id=607 bgcolor=#E9E9E9
| 586607 ||  || — || April 29, 2014 || Haleakala || Pan-STARRS ||  || align=right | 1.7 km || 
|-id=608 bgcolor=#fefefe
| 586608 ||  || — || February 11, 2004 || Palomar || NEAT ||  || align=right data-sort-value="0.79" | 790 m || 
|-id=609 bgcolor=#fefefe
| 586609 ||  || — || October 12, 2010 || Mount Lemmon || Mount Lemmon Survey ||  || align=right data-sort-value="0.70" | 700 m || 
|-id=610 bgcolor=#fefefe
| 586610 ||  || — || March 2, 2008 || Kitt Peak || Spacewatch ||  || align=right data-sort-value="0.64" | 640 m || 
|-id=611 bgcolor=#fefefe
| 586611 ||  || — || October 31, 2010 || Kitt Peak || Spacewatch ||  || align=right data-sort-value="0.66" | 660 m || 
|-id=612 bgcolor=#d6d6d6
| 586612 ||  || — || November 28, 2013 || Mount Lemmon || Mount Lemmon Survey ||  || align=right | 1.7 km || 
|-id=613 bgcolor=#fefefe
| 586613 ||  || — || February 16, 2004 || Kitt Peak || Spacewatch || H || align=right data-sort-value="0.59" | 590 m || 
|-id=614 bgcolor=#fefefe
| 586614 ||  || — || February 23, 2004 || Socorro || LINEAR || H || align=right data-sort-value="0.61" | 610 m || 
|-id=615 bgcolor=#fefefe
| 586615 ||  || — || August 26, 2005 || Palomar || NEAT ||  || align=right data-sort-value="0.56" | 560 m || 
|-id=616 bgcolor=#fefefe
| 586616 ||  || — || March 31, 2008 || Mount Lemmon || Mount Lemmon Survey ||  || align=right data-sort-value="0.58" | 580 m || 
|-id=617 bgcolor=#d6d6d6
| 586617 ||  || — || November 3, 2007 || Mount Lemmon || Mount Lemmon Survey ||  || align=right | 1.6 km || 
|-id=618 bgcolor=#E9E9E9
| 586618 ||  || — || February 16, 2004 || Kitt Peak || Spacewatch ||  || align=right | 2.1 km || 
|-id=619 bgcolor=#d6d6d6
| 586619 ||  || — || March 15, 2004 || Valmeca || C. Demeautis, D. Matter ||  || align=right | 2.0 km || 
|-id=620 bgcolor=#fefefe
| 586620 ||  || — || March 11, 2004 || Palomar || NEAT || H || align=right data-sort-value="0.51" | 510 m || 
|-id=621 bgcolor=#E9E9E9
| 586621 ||  || — || March 15, 2004 || Kitt Peak || Spacewatch ||  || align=right | 1.3 km || 
|-id=622 bgcolor=#d6d6d6
| 586622 ||  || — || March 15, 2004 || Kitt Peak || Spacewatch ||  || align=right | 2.0 km || 
|-id=623 bgcolor=#d6d6d6
| 586623 ||  || — || March 15, 2004 || Kitt Peak || Spacewatch ||  || align=right | 1.8 km || 
|-id=624 bgcolor=#d6d6d6
| 586624 ||  || — || March 9, 2004 || Palomar || NEAT ||  || align=right | 2.6 km || 
|-id=625 bgcolor=#d6d6d6
| 586625 ||  || — || March 17, 2004 || Kitt Peak || Spacewatch ||  || align=right | 1.7 km || 
|-id=626 bgcolor=#fefefe
| 586626 ||  || — || March 11, 2004 || Palomar || NEAT || H || align=right data-sort-value="0.52" | 520 m || 
|-id=627 bgcolor=#d6d6d6
| 586627 ||  || — || March 23, 2004 || Kitt Peak || Spacewatch ||  || align=right | 2.1 km || 
|-id=628 bgcolor=#fefefe
| 586628 ||  || — || March 17, 2004 || Kitt Peak || Spacewatch ||  || align=right data-sort-value="0.55" | 550 m || 
|-id=629 bgcolor=#fefefe
| 586629 ||  || — || March 17, 2004 || Kitt Peak || Spacewatch ||  || align=right data-sort-value="0.73" | 730 m || 
|-id=630 bgcolor=#d6d6d6
| 586630 ||  || — || August 29, 2016 || Mount Lemmon || Mount Lemmon Survey ||  || align=right | 2.2 km || 
|-id=631 bgcolor=#FA8072
| 586631 ||  || — || November 27, 2013 || Haleakala || Pan-STARRS ||  || align=right data-sort-value="0.93" | 930 m || 
|-id=632 bgcolor=#d6d6d6
| 586632 ||  || — || September 21, 2011 || Haleakala || Pan-STARRS ||  || align=right | 1.8 km || 
|-id=633 bgcolor=#d6d6d6
| 586633 ||  || — || February 9, 2014 || Kitt Peak || Spacewatch ||  || align=right | 2.0 km || 
|-id=634 bgcolor=#d6d6d6
| 586634 ||  || — || February 27, 2014 || Haleakala || Pan-STARRS ||  || align=right | 2.2 km || 
|-id=635 bgcolor=#d6d6d6
| 586635 ||  || — || March 16, 2004 || Kitt Peak || Spacewatch ||  || align=right | 1.9 km || 
|-id=636 bgcolor=#d6d6d6
| 586636 ||  || — || April 14, 2004 || Kitt Peak || Spacewatch ||  || align=right | 1.9 km || 
|-id=637 bgcolor=#fefefe
| 586637 ||  || — || April 13, 2004 || Kitt Peak || Spacewatch ||  || align=right data-sort-value="0.58" | 580 m || 
|-id=638 bgcolor=#fefefe
| 586638 ||  || — || April 13, 2004 || Kitt Peak || Spacewatch ||  || align=right data-sort-value="0.57" | 570 m || 
|-id=639 bgcolor=#E9E9E9
| 586639 ||  || — || April 14, 2004 || Kitt Peak || Spacewatch ||  || align=right data-sort-value="0.72" | 720 m || 
|-id=640 bgcolor=#fefefe
| 586640 ||  || — || April 14, 2004 || Kitt Peak || Spacewatch ||  || align=right data-sort-value="0.48" | 480 m || 
|-id=641 bgcolor=#fefefe
| 586641 ||  || — || February 23, 2007 || Kitt Peak || Spacewatch ||  || align=right data-sort-value="0.53" | 530 m || 
|-id=642 bgcolor=#C2FFFF
| 586642 ||  || — || April 16, 2004 || Kitt Peak || Spacewatch || L4 || align=right | 7.6 km || 
|-id=643 bgcolor=#fefefe
| 586643 ||  || — || April 19, 2004 || Kitt Peak || Spacewatch ||  || align=right data-sort-value="0.61" | 610 m || 
|-id=644 bgcolor=#C2FFFF
| 586644 ||  || — || April 28, 2004 || Kitt Peak || Spacewatch || L4 || align=right | 8.6 km || 
|-id=645 bgcolor=#E9E9E9
| 586645 ||  || — || April 28, 2004 || Kitt Peak || Spacewatch ||  || align=right | 2.1 km || 
|-id=646 bgcolor=#d6d6d6
| 586646 ||  || — || April 26, 2004 || Mauna Kea || Mauna Kea Obs. ||  || align=right | 1.8 km || 
|-id=647 bgcolor=#d6d6d6
| 586647 ||  || — || January 18, 2008 || Mount Lemmon || Mount Lemmon Survey ||  || align=right | 2.3 km || 
|-id=648 bgcolor=#fefefe
| 586648 ||  || — || February 21, 2007 || Mount Lemmon || Mount Lemmon Survey ||  || align=right data-sort-value="0.64" | 640 m || 
|-id=649 bgcolor=#d6d6d6
| 586649 ||  || — || November 22, 2011 || Mount Lemmon || Mount Lemmon Survey ||  || align=right | 1.8 km || 
|-id=650 bgcolor=#E9E9E9
| 586650 ||  || — || April 25, 2004 || Kitt Peak || Spacewatch ||  || align=right data-sort-value="0.52" | 520 m || 
|-id=651 bgcolor=#fefefe
| 586651 ||  || — || November 19, 2015 || Mount Lemmon || Mount Lemmon Survey ||  || align=right data-sort-value="0.56" | 560 m || 
|-id=652 bgcolor=#fefefe
| 586652 ||  || — || November 15, 2006 || Mount Lemmon || Mount Lemmon Survey ||  || align=right data-sort-value="0.85" | 850 m || 
|-id=653 bgcolor=#d6d6d6
| 586653 ||  || — || January 26, 2014 || Haleakala || Pan-STARRS ||  || align=right | 1.6 km || 
|-id=654 bgcolor=#C2FFFF
| 586654 ||  || — || September 11, 2008 || Bergisch Gladbach || W. Bickel || L4 || align=right | 7.1 km || 
|-id=655 bgcolor=#d6d6d6
| 586655 ||  || — || September 29, 2011 || Mount Lemmon || Mount Lemmon Survey ||  || align=right | 2.0 km || 
|-id=656 bgcolor=#E9E9E9
| 586656 ||  || — || May 13, 2004 || Kitt Peak || Spacewatch ||  || align=right data-sort-value="0.83" | 830 m || 
|-id=657 bgcolor=#C2FFFF
| 586657 ||  || — || December 2, 2010 || Mount Lemmon || Mount Lemmon Survey || L4 || align=right | 7.5 km || 
|-id=658 bgcolor=#fefefe
| 586658 ||  || — || December 18, 2009 || Kitt Peak || Spacewatch ||  || align=right data-sort-value="0.53" | 530 m || 
|-id=659 bgcolor=#fefefe
| 586659 ||  || — || April 24, 2012 || Mount Lemmon || Mount Lemmon Survey || H || align=right data-sort-value="0.62" | 620 m || 
|-id=660 bgcolor=#d6d6d6
| 586660 ||  || — || May 27, 2004 || Kitt Peak || Spacewatch ||  || align=right | 2.3 km || 
|-id=661 bgcolor=#E9E9E9
| 586661 ||  || — || April 27, 2008 || Kitt Peak || Spacewatch ||  || align=right data-sort-value="0.84" | 840 m || 
|-id=662 bgcolor=#C2FFFF
| 586662 ||  || — || June 12, 2004 || Kitt Peak || Spacewatch || L4 || align=right | 9.7 km || 
|-id=663 bgcolor=#E9E9E9
| 586663 ||  || — || June 14, 2004 || Kitt Peak || Spacewatch ||  || align=right data-sort-value="0.73" | 730 m || 
|-id=664 bgcolor=#C2FFFF
| 586664 ||  || — || January 4, 2013 || Kitt Peak || Spacewatch || L4 || align=right | 9.9 km || 
|-id=665 bgcolor=#d6d6d6
| 586665 ||  || — || August 7, 2015 || Haleakala || Pan-STARRS ||  || align=right | 2.5 km || 
|-id=666 bgcolor=#E9E9E9
| 586666 ||  || — || April 21, 2012 || Mount Lemmon || Mount Lemmon Survey ||  || align=right data-sort-value="0.79" | 790 m || 
|-id=667 bgcolor=#d6d6d6
| 586667 ||  || — || July 15, 2004 || Siding Spring || SSS ||  || align=right | 3.8 km || 
|-id=668 bgcolor=#fefefe
| 586668 ||  || — || July 16, 2004 || Socorro || LINEAR ||  || align=right data-sort-value="0.79" | 790 m || 
|-id=669 bgcolor=#E9E9E9
| 586669 ||  || — || July 17, 2004 || Cerro Tololo || Cerro Tololo Obs. ||  || align=right | 1.0 km || 
|-id=670 bgcolor=#fefefe
| 586670 ||  || — || December 25, 2005 || Mount Lemmon || Mount Lemmon Survey ||  || align=right data-sort-value="0.53" | 530 m || 
|-id=671 bgcolor=#E9E9E9
| 586671 ||  || — || March 13, 2007 || Mount Lemmon || Mount Lemmon Survey ||  || align=right data-sort-value="0.81" | 810 m || 
|-id=672 bgcolor=#E9E9E9
| 586672 ||  || — || August 10, 2004 || Socorro || LINEAR ||  || align=right data-sort-value="0.97" | 970 m || 
|-id=673 bgcolor=#E9E9E9
| 586673 ||  || — || August 8, 2004 || Palomar || NEAT ||  || align=right | 1.2 km || 
|-id=674 bgcolor=#d6d6d6
| 586674 ||  || — || August 13, 2004 || Palomar || NEAT ||  || align=right | 2.4 km || 
|-id=675 bgcolor=#E9E9E9
| 586675 ||  || — || August 7, 2004 || Palomar || NEAT ||  || align=right data-sort-value="0.97" | 970 m || 
|-id=676 bgcolor=#d6d6d6
| 586676 ||  || — || August 18, 2015 || Kitt Peak || Spacewatch ||  || align=right | 2.7 km || 
|-id=677 bgcolor=#d6d6d6
| 586677 ||  || — || October 30, 2010 || Mount Lemmon || Mount Lemmon Survey ||  || align=right | 2.8 km || 
|-id=678 bgcolor=#d6d6d6
| 586678 ||  || — || October 5, 2005 || Kitt Peak || Spacewatch ||  || align=right | 1.9 km || 
|-id=679 bgcolor=#E9E9E9
| 586679 ||  || — || July 16, 2004 || Siding Spring || SSS ||  || align=right | 1.3 km || 
|-id=680 bgcolor=#d6d6d6
| 586680 ||  || — || January 24, 2007 || Mount Lemmon || Mount Lemmon Survey ||  || align=right | 2.9 km || 
|-id=681 bgcolor=#d6d6d6
| 586681 ||  || — || October 31, 1999 || Kitt Peak || Spacewatch ||  || align=right | 2.3 km || 
|-id=682 bgcolor=#E9E9E9
| 586682 ||  || — || December 12, 2013 || Haleakala || Pan-STARRS ||  || align=right data-sort-value="0.98" | 980 m || 
|-id=683 bgcolor=#fefefe
| 586683 ||  || — || October 5, 2011 || Piszkesteto || K. Sárneczky ||  || align=right data-sort-value="0.67" | 670 m || 
|-id=684 bgcolor=#d6d6d6
| 586684 ||  || — || July 17, 2004 || Cerro Tololo || Cerro Tololo Obs. ||  || align=right | 2.4 km || 
|-id=685 bgcolor=#d6d6d6
| 586685 ||  || — || August 22, 2004 || Kitt Peak || Spacewatch ||  || align=right | 2.7 km || 
|-id=686 bgcolor=#fefefe
| 586686 ||  || — || September 27, 2011 || Mount Lemmon || Mount Lemmon Survey ||  || align=right data-sort-value="0.58" | 580 m || 
|-id=687 bgcolor=#d6d6d6
| 586687 ||  || — || August 22, 2004 || Kitt Peak || Spacewatch ||  || align=right | 2.0 km || 
|-id=688 bgcolor=#E9E9E9
| 586688 ||  || — || August 22, 2004 || Kitt Peak || Spacewatch ||  || align=right data-sort-value="0.71" | 710 m || 
|-id=689 bgcolor=#d6d6d6
| 586689 ||  || — || March 5, 2013 || Haleakala || Pan-STARRS ||  || align=right | 2.7 km || 
|-id=690 bgcolor=#E9E9E9
| 586690 ||  || — || August 8, 2004 || Palomar || NEAT ||  || align=right data-sort-value="0.87" | 870 m || 
|-id=691 bgcolor=#d6d6d6
| 586691 ||  || — || August 21, 2004 || Siding Spring || SSS ||  || align=right | 3.3 km || 
|-id=692 bgcolor=#E9E9E9
| 586692 ||  || — || July 14, 2004 || Siding Spring || SSS ||  || align=right | 1.7 km || 
|-id=693 bgcolor=#d6d6d6
| 586693 ||  || — || March 13, 2002 || Kitt Peak || Spacewatch ||  || align=right | 2.3 km || 
|-id=694 bgcolor=#E9E9E9
| 586694 ||  || — || September 7, 2004 || Kitt Peak || Spacewatch ||  || align=right data-sort-value="0.83" | 830 m || 
|-id=695 bgcolor=#E9E9E9
| 586695 ||  || — || September 8, 2004 || Socorro || LINEAR ||  || align=right | 1.4 km || 
|-id=696 bgcolor=#fefefe
| 586696 ||  || — || September 7, 2004 || Kitt Peak || Spacewatch ||  || align=right data-sort-value="0.69" | 690 m || 
|-id=697 bgcolor=#E9E9E9
| 586697 ||  || — || September 7, 2004 || Kitt Peak || Spacewatch ||  || align=right data-sort-value="0.78" | 780 m || 
|-id=698 bgcolor=#E9E9E9
| 586698 ||  || — || September 7, 2004 || Palomar || NEAT ||  || align=right | 1.4 km || 
|-id=699 bgcolor=#d6d6d6
| 586699 ||  || — || September 7, 2004 || Kitt Peak || Spacewatch ||  || align=right | 2.4 km || 
|-id=700 bgcolor=#E9E9E9
| 586700 ||  || — || September 7, 2004 || Kitt Peak || Spacewatch ||  || align=right data-sort-value="0.68" | 680 m || 
|}

586701–586800 

|-bgcolor=#d6d6d6
| 586701 ||  || — || September 7, 2004 || Kitt Peak || Spacewatch ||  || align=right | 2.1 km || 
|-id=702 bgcolor=#E9E9E9
| 586702 ||  || — || August 15, 2004 || Cerro Tololo || Cerro Tololo Obs. ||  || align=right data-sort-value="0.84" | 840 m || 
|-id=703 bgcolor=#d6d6d6
| 586703 ||  || — || September 8, 2004 || Palomar || NEAT ||  || align=right | 3.1 km || 
|-id=704 bgcolor=#d6d6d6
| 586704 ||  || — || August 10, 2004 || Palomar || NEAT || TIR || align=right | 3.7 km || 
|-id=705 bgcolor=#E9E9E9
| 586705 ||  || — || September 8, 2004 || Socorro || LINEAR ||  || align=right | 1.4 km || 
|-id=706 bgcolor=#d6d6d6
| 586706 ||  || — || September 10, 2004 || Socorro || LINEAR ||  || align=right | 2.4 km || 
|-id=707 bgcolor=#E9E9E9
| 586707 ||  || — || September 8, 2004 || Apache Point || J. C. Barentine ||  || align=right | 1.8 km || 
|-id=708 bgcolor=#fefefe
| 586708 ||  || — || January 23, 2006 || Kitt Peak || Spacewatch ||  || align=right | 1.0 km || 
|-id=709 bgcolor=#d6d6d6
| 586709 ||  || — || September 9, 2004 || Kitt Peak || Spacewatch ||  || align=right | 2.1 km || 
|-id=710 bgcolor=#E9E9E9
| 586710 ||  || — || August 13, 2004 || Palomar || NEAT ||  || align=right data-sort-value="0.97" | 970 m || 
|-id=711 bgcolor=#d6d6d6
| 586711 ||  || — || July 10, 2004 || Palomar || NEAT ||  || align=right | 2.5 km || 
|-id=712 bgcolor=#E9E9E9
| 586712 ||  || — || September 10, 2004 || Kitt Peak || Spacewatch ||  || align=right | 1.3 km || 
|-id=713 bgcolor=#d6d6d6
| 586713 ||  || — || September 7, 2004 || Palomar || NEAT ||  || align=right | 3.1 km || 
|-id=714 bgcolor=#d6d6d6
| 586714 ||  || — || September 11, 2004 || Socorro || LINEAR ||  || align=right | 2.9 km || 
|-id=715 bgcolor=#d6d6d6
| 586715 ||  || — || September 10, 2004 || Kitt Peak || Spacewatch ||  || align=right | 3.0 km || 
|-id=716 bgcolor=#E9E9E9
| 586716 ||  || — || May 6, 2003 || Kitt Peak || Spacewatch ||  || align=right data-sort-value="0.77" | 770 m || 
|-id=717 bgcolor=#d6d6d6
| 586717 ||  || — || September 10, 2004 || Kitt Peak || Spacewatch ||  || align=right | 1.8 km || 
|-id=718 bgcolor=#E9E9E9
| 586718 ||  || — || September 11, 2004 || Socorro || LINEAR ||  || align=right data-sort-value="0.87" | 870 m || 
|-id=719 bgcolor=#E9E9E9
| 586719 ||  || — || September 11, 2004 || Kitt Peak || Spacewatch ||  || align=right data-sort-value="0.89" | 890 m || 
|-id=720 bgcolor=#E9E9E9
| 586720 ||  || — || September 10, 2004 || Kitt Peak || Spacewatch ||  || align=right data-sort-value="0.97" | 970 m || 
|-id=721 bgcolor=#d6d6d6
| 586721 ||  || — || September 10, 2004 || Kitt Peak || Spacewatch ||  || align=right | 2.3 km || 
|-id=722 bgcolor=#E9E9E9
| 586722 ||  || — || September 10, 2004 || Kitt Peak || Spacewatch ||  || align=right | 1.1 km || 
|-id=723 bgcolor=#E9E9E9
| 586723 ||  || — || September 11, 2004 || Kitt Peak || Spacewatch ||  || align=right data-sort-value="0.91" | 910 m || 
|-id=724 bgcolor=#E9E9E9
| 586724 ||  || — || September 15, 2004 || Kitt Peak || Spacewatch ||  || align=right | 1.2 km || 
|-id=725 bgcolor=#d6d6d6
| 586725 ||  || — || September 11, 2004 || Kitt Peak || Spacewatch ||  || align=right | 2.2 km || 
|-id=726 bgcolor=#E9E9E9
| 586726 ||  || — || September 8, 2004 || Socorro || LINEAR ||  || align=right | 1.3 km || 
|-id=727 bgcolor=#d6d6d6
| 586727 ||  || — || September 11, 2004 || Kitt Peak || Spacewatch ||  || align=right | 2.4 km || 
|-id=728 bgcolor=#d6d6d6
| 586728 ||  || — || September 11, 2004 || Kitt Peak || Spacewatch ||  || align=right | 2.4 km || 
|-id=729 bgcolor=#E9E9E9
| 586729 ||  || — || September 11, 2004 || Kitt Peak || Spacewatch ||  || align=right | 1.1 km || 
|-id=730 bgcolor=#E9E9E9
| 586730 ||  || — || September 13, 2004 || Socorro || LINEAR ||  || align=right | 1.2 km || 
|-id=731 bgcolor=#E9E9E9
| 586731 ||  || — || September 15, 2004 || Kitt Peak || Spacewatch ||  || align=right | 1.6 km || 
|-id=732 bgcolor=#d6d6d6
| 586732 ||  || — || September 15, 2004 || Kitt Peak || Spacewatch ||  || align=right | 3.5 km || 
|-id=733 bgcolor=#E9E9E9
| 586733 ||  || — || September 15, 2004 || Kitt Peak || Spacewatch ||  || align=right | 1.1 km || 
|-id=734 bgcolor=#d6d6d6
| 586734 ||  || — || September 11, 2004 || Kitt Peak || Spacewatch ||  || align=right | 3.0 km || 
|-id=735 bgcolor=#d6d6d6
| 586735 ||  || — || December 29, 2011 || Mount Lemmon || Mount Lemmon Survey ||  || align=right | 2.8 km || 
|-id=736 bgcolor=#d6d6d6
| 586736 ||  || — || November 13, 2010 || Mount Lemmon || Mount Lemmon Survey ||  || align=right | 2.6 km || 
|-id=737 bgcolor=#d6d6d6
| 586737 ||  || — || February 3, 2012 || Haleakala || Pan-STARRS ||  || align=right | 2.6 km || 
|-id=738 bgcolor=#d6d6d6
| 586738 ||  || — || March 26, 2008 || Mount Lemmon || Mount Lemmon Survey ||  || align=right | 2.2 km || 
|-id=739 bgcolor=#d6d6d6
| 586739 ||  || — || March 5, 2013 || Haleakala || Pan-STARRS ||  || align=right | 2.4 km || 
|-id=740 bgcolor=#E9E9E9
| 586740 ||  || — || September 23, 2008 || Mount Lemmon || Mount Lemmon Survey ||  || align=right | 2.0 km || 
|-id=741 bgcolor=#d6d6d6
| 586741 ||  || — || October 25, 2005 || Mount Lemmon || Mount Lemmon Survey ||  || align=right | 3.2 km || 
|-id=742 bgcolor=#d6d6d6
| 586742 ||  || — || May 4, 2014 || Haleakala || Pan-STARRS ||  || align=right | 2.3 km || 
|-id=743 bgcolor=#d6d6d6
| 586743 ||  || — || September 11, 2004 || Kitt Peak || Spacewatch ||  || align=right | 2.5 km || 
|-id=744 bgcolor=#d6d6d6
| 586744 ||  || — || August 13, 2004 || Cerro Tololo || Cerro Tololo Obs. ||  || align=right | 2.4 km || 
|-id=745 bgcolor=#d6d6d6
| 586745 ||  || — || September 9, 2004 || Kitt Peak || Spacewatch ||  || align=right | 1.8 km || 
|-id=746 bgcolor=#fefefe
| 586746 ||  || — || July 17, 2004 || Cerro Tololo || Cerro Tololo Obs. ||  || align=right data-sort-value="0.75" | 750 m || 
|-id=747 bgcolor=#d6d6d6
| 586747 ||  || — || September 17, 2004 || Kitt Peak || Spacewatch ||  || align=right | 2.7 km || 
|-id=748 bgcolor=#d6d6d6
| 586748 ||  || — || September 10, 2004 || Kitt Peak || Spacewatch ||  || align=right | 3.1 km || 
|-id=749 bgcolor=#fefefe
| 586749 ||  || — || September 18, 2004 || Socorro || LINEAR ||  || align=right data-sort-value="0.85" | 850 m || 
|-id=750 bgcolor=#E9E9E9
| 586750 ||  || — || September 18, 2004 || Socorro || LINEAR ||  || align=right | 1.4 km || 
|-id=751 bgcolor=#d6d6d6
| 586751 ||  || — || September 22, 2004 || Kitt Peak || Spacewatch ||  || align=right | 2.4 km || 
|-id=752 bgcolor=#d6d6d6
| 586752 ||  || — || August 21, 2015 || Haleakala || Pan-STARRS ||  || align=right | 2.5 km || 
|-id=753 bgcolor=#E9E9E9
| 586753 ||  || — || December 31, 2013 || Kitt Peak || Spacewatch ||  || align=right data-sort-value="0.86" | 860 m || 
|-id=754 bgcolor=#fefefe
| 586754 ||  || — || February 1, 2006 || Kitt Peak || Spacewatch || H || align=right data-sort-value="0.51" | 510 m || 
|-id=755 bgcolor=#d6d6d6
| 586755 ||  || — || September 24, 2004 || Kitt Peak || Spacewatch ||  || align=right | 2.1 km || 
|-id=756 bgcolor=#d6d6d6
| 586756 ||  || — || September 16, 2009 || Mount Lemmon || Mount Lemmon Survey ||  || align=right | 1.8 km || 
|-id=757 bgcolor=#d6d6d6
| 586757 ||  || — || February 10, 2008 || Kitt Peak || Spacewatch ||  || align=right | 2.2 km || 
|-id=758 bgcolor=#E9E9E9
| 586758 ||  || — || September 18, 2004 || Socorro || LINEAR ||  || align=right | 1.1 km || 
|-id=759 bgcolor=#d6d6d6
| 586759 ||  || — || October 4, 2004 || Kitt Peak || Spacewatch ||  || align=right | 2.9 km || 
|-id=760 bgcolor=#E9E9E9
| 586760 ||  || — || October 10, 2004 || Socorro || LINEAR ||  || align=right | 1.7 km || 
|-id=761 bgcolor=#E9E9E9
| 586761 ||  || — || September 8, 2004 || Socorro || LINEAR ||  || align=right | 1.6 km || 
|-id=762 bgcolor=#d6d6d6
| 586762 ||  || — || October 4, 2004 || Kitt Peak || Spacewatch ||  || align=right | 2.5 km || 
|-id=763 bgcolor=#E9E9E9
| 586763 ||  || — || October 5, 2004 || Anderson Mesa || LONEOS ||  || align=right | 1.7 km || 
|-id=764 bgcolor=#E9E9E9
| 586764 ||  || — || October 4, 2004 || Kitt Peak || Spacewatch ||  || align=right | 1.00 km || 
|-id=765 bgcolor=#E9E9E9
| 586765 ||  || — || October 5, 2004 || Kitt Peak || Spacewatch ||  || align=right | 1.1 km || 
|-id=766 bgcolor=#d6d6d6
| 586766 ||  || — || October 4, 2004 || Kitt Peak || Spacewatch ||  || align=right | 2.9 km || 
|-id=767 bgcolor=#d6d6d6
| 586767 ||  || — || October 6, 2004 || Kitt Peak || Spacewatch ||  || align=right | 2.1 km || 
|-id=768 bgcolor=#d6d6d6
| 586768 ||  || — || October 6, 2004 || Kitt Peak || Spacewatch ||  || align=right | 3.1 km || 
|-id=769 bgcolor=#E9E9E9
| 586769 ||  || — || September 23, 2004 || Kitt Peak || Spacewatch ||  || align=right | 1.1 km || 
|-id=770 bgcolor=#E9E9E9
| 586770 ||  || — || October 6, 2004 || Kitt Peak || Spacewatch ||  || align=right | 1.00 km || 
|-id=771 bgcolor=#d6d6d6
| 586771 ||  || — || October 7, 2004 || Kitt Peak || Spacewatch ||  || align=right | 2.7 km || 
|-id=772 bgcolor=#E9E9E9
| 586772 ||  || — || October 7, 2004 || Kitt Peak || Spacewatch ||  || align=right data-sort-value="0.94" | 940 m || 
|-id=773 bgcolor=#E9E9E9
| 586773 ||  || — || October 7, 2004 || Kitt Peak || Spacewatch ||  || align=right data-sort-value="0.98" | 980 m || 
|-id=774 bgcolor=#E9E9E9
| 586774 ||  || — || October 5, 2004 || Kitt Peak || Spacewatch ||  || align=right | 1.2 km || 
|-id=775 bgcolor=#E9E9E9
| 586775 ||  || — || October 5, 2004 || Powell || R. Trentman ||  || align=right | 1.3 km || 
|-id=776 bgcolor=#E9E9E9
| 586776 ||  || — || October 8, 2004 || Kitt Peak || Spacewatch ||  || align=right | 1.5 km || 
|-id=777 bgcolor=#d6d6d6
| 586777 ||  || — || October 8, 2004 || Kitt Peak || Spacewatch ||  || align=right | 3.3 km || 
|-id=778 bgcolor=#d6d6d6
| 586778 ||  || — || October 8, 2004 || Kitt Peak || Spacewatch ||  || align=right | 2.3 km || 
|-id=779 bgcolor=#d6d6d6
| 586779 ||  || — || October 8, 2004 || Kitt Peak || Spacewatch ||  || align=right | 2.8 km || 
|-id=780 bgcolor=#E9E9E9
| 586780 ||  || — || October 9, 2004 || Kitt Peak || Spacewatch ||  || align=right | 1.2 km || 
|-id=781 bgcolor=#d6d6d6
| 586781 ||  || — || October 8, 2004 || Palomar || NEAT || THB || align=right | 3.1 km || 
|-id=782 bgcolor=#E9E9E9
| 586782 ||  || — || October 9, 2004 || Kitt Peak || Spacewatch ||  || align=right | 1.1 km || 
|-id=783 bgcolor=#E9E9E9
| 586783 ||  || — || October 9, 2004 || Kitt Peak || Spacewatch ||  || align=right | 1.2 km || 
|-id=784 bgcolor=#d6d6d6
| 586784 ||  || — || October 9, 2004 || Kitt Peak || Spacewatch ||  || align=right | 2.8 km || 
|-id=785 bgcolor=#E9E9E9
| 586785 ||  || — || September 17, 2004 || Kitt Peak || Spacewatch ||  || align=right | 1.3 km || 
|-id=786 bgcolor=#d6d6d6
| 586786 ||  || — || September 22, 2004 || Kitt Peak || Spacewatch ||  || align=right | 2.6 km || 
|-id=787 bgcolor=#E9E9E9
| 586787 ||  || — || October 10, 2004 || Kitt Peak || Spacewatch ||  || align=right | 1.4 km || 
|-id=788 bgcolor=#d6d6d6
| 586788 ||  || — || October 10, 2004 || Kitt Peak || Spacewatch ||  || align=right | 2.5 km || 
|-id=789 bgcolor=#d6d6d6
| 586789 ||  || — || October 10, 2004 || Kitt Peak || Spacewatch ||  || align=right | 2.6 km || 
|-id=790 bgcolor=#d6d6d6
| 586790 ||  || — || October 10, 2004 || Kitt Peak || Spacewatch ||  || align=right | 2.5 km || 
|-id=791 bgcolor=#d6d6d6
| 586791 ||  || — || October 11, 2004 || Kitt Peak || Spacewatch ||  || align=right | 2.2 km || 
|-id=792 bgcolor=#d6d6d6
| 586792 ||  || — || October 11, 2004 || Kitt Peak || Spacewatch ||  || align=right | 2.8 km || 
|-id=793 bgcolor=#E9E9E9
| 586793 ||  || — || October 8, 2004 || Kitt Peak || Spacewatch ||  || align=right | 1.3 km || 
|-id=794 bgcolor=#d6d6d6
| 586794 ||  || — || October 8, 2004 || Kitt Peak || Spacewatch ||  || align=right | 2.8 km || 
|-id=795 bgcolor=#fefefe
| 586795 ||  || — || October 10, 2004 || Kitt Peak || Spacewatch ||  || align=right data-sort-value="0.52" | 520 m || 
|-id=796 bgcolor=#E9E9E9
| 586796 ||  || — || August 23, 2004 || Kitt Peak || Spacewatch ||  || align=right data-sort-value="0.72" | 720 m || 
|-id=797 bgcolor=#d6d6d6
| 586797 ||  || — || October 11, 2004 || Kitt Peak || L. H. Wasserman, J. R. Lovering ||  || align=right | 2.4 km || 
|-id=798 bgcolor=#E9E9E9
| 586798 ||  || — || October 18, 2009 || Mount Lemmon || Mount Lemmon Survey ||  || align=right | 1.7 km || 
|-id=799 bgcolor=#E9E9E9
| 586799 ||  || — || July 30, 2008 || Kitt Peak || Spacewatch ||  || align=right | 1.1 km || 
|-id=800 bgcolor=#fefefe
| 586800 ||  || — || May 3, 2006 || Mount Lemmon || Mount Lemmon Survey ||  || align=right data-sort-value="0.66" | 660 m || 
|}

586801–586900 

|-bgcolor=#d6d6d6
| 586801 ||  || — || May 7, 2014 || Haleakala || Pan-STARRS ||  || align=right | 2.1 km || 
|-id=802 bgcolor=#E9E9E9
| 586802 ||  || — || July 8, 2008 || Mount Lemmon || Mount Lemmon Survey ||  || align=right | 1.3 km || 
|-id=803 bgcolor=#fefefe
| 586803 ||  || — || February 9, 2013 || Haleakala || Pan-STARRS ||  || align=right data-sort-value="0.65" | 650 m || 
|-id=804 bgcolor=#E9E9E9
| 586804 ||  || — || September 6, 2008 || Mount Lemmon || Mount Lemmon Survey ||  || align=right data-sort-value="0.96" | 960 m || 
|-id=805 bgcolor=#E9E9E9
| 586805 ||  || — || February 16, 2015 || Haleakala || Pan-STARRS ||  || align=right | 1.2 km || 
|-id=806 bgcolor=#fefefe
| 586806 ||  || — || October 6, 2004 || Kitt Peak || Spacewatch ||  || align=right data-sort-value="0.62" | 620 m || 
|-id=807 bgcolor=#d6d6d6
| 586807 ||  || — || March 13, 2013 || Haleakala || Pan-STARRS ||  || align=right | 2.3 km || 
|-id=808 bgcolor=#d6d6d6
| 586808 ||  || — || October 24, 2009 || Kitt Peak || Spacewatch ||  || align=right | 1.6 km || 
|-id=809 bgcolor=#E9E9E9
| 586809 ||  || — || October 10, 2004 || Kitt Peak || L. H. Wasserman, J. R. Lovering ||  || align=right | 1.9 km || 
|-id=810 bgcolor=#d6d6d6
| 586810 ||  || — || October 15, 2004 || Mount Lemmon || Mount Lemmon Survey ||  || align=right | 3.2 km || 
|-id=811 bgcolor=#E9E9E9
| 586811 ||  || — || October 20, 2004 || Socorro || LINEAR ||  || align=right | 1.8 km || 
|-id=812 bgcolor=#E9E9E9
| 586812 ||  || — || November 5, 2004 || Palomar || NEAT ||  || align=right | 2.2 km || 
|-id=813 bgcolor=#E9E9E9
| 586813 ||  || — || October 23, 2004 || Kitt Peak || Spacewatch ||  || align=right | 1.2 km || 
|-id=814 bgcolor=#fefefe
| 586814 ||  || — || November 3, 2004 || Kitt Peak || Spacewatch ||  || align=right data-sort-value="0.56" | 560 m || 
|-id=815 bgcolor=#fefefe
| 586815 ||  || — || November 4, 2004 || Kitt Peak || Spacewatch ||  || align=right data-sort-value="0.71" | 710 m || 
|-id=816 bgcolor=#E9E9E9
| 586816 ||  || — || November 4, 2004 || Kitt Peak || Spacewatch ||  || align=right | 1.3 km || 
|-id=817 bgcolor=#E9E9E9
| 586817 ||  || — || November 4, 2004 || Kitt Peak || Spacewatch ||  || align=right | 1.3 km || 
|-id=818 bgcolor=#E9E9E9
| 586818 ||  || — || November 4, 2004 || Kitt Peak || Spacewatch ||  || align=right | 1.4 km || 
|-id=819 bgcolor=#d6d6d6
| 586819 ||  || — || October 24, 2005 || Mauna Kea || Mauna Kea Obs. ||  || align=right | 2.4 km || 
|-id=820 bgcolor=#E9E9E9
| 586820 ||  || — || November 7, 2004 || Needville || Needville Obs. ||  || align=right | 1.8 km || 
|-id=821 bgcolor=#d6d6d6
| 586821 ||  || — || November 10, 2004 || Kitt Peak || Spacewatch ||  || align=right | 3.4 km || 
|-id=822 bgcolor=#E9E9E9
| 586822 ||  || — || November 9, 2004 || Mauna Kea || Mauna Kea Obs. ||  || align=right | 1.1 km || 
|-id=823 bgcolor=#E9E9E9
| 586823 ||  || — || November 9, 2004 || Mauna Kea || Mauna Kea Obs. ||  || align=right | 1.1 km || 
|-id=824 bgcolor=#fefefe
| 586824 ||  || — || November 9, 2004 || Mauna Kea || Mauna Kea Obs. ||  || align=right data-sort-value="0.53" | 530 m || 
|-id=825 bgcolor=#d6d6d6
| 586825 ||  || — || November 3, 2004 || Kitt Peak || Spacewatch ||  || align=right | 3.6 km || 
|-id=826 bgcolor=#d6d6d6
| 586826 ||  || — || November 4, 2004 || Catalina || CSS ||  || align=right | 4.2 km || 
|-id=827 bgcolor=#fefefe
| 586827 ||  || — || October 15, 2004 || Kitt Peak || M. W. Buie, D. E. Trilling ||  || align=right data-sort-value="0.59" | 590 m || 
|-id=828 bgcolor=#d6d6d6
| 586828 ||  || — || November 6, 2010 || Mount Lemmon || Mount Lemmon Survey ||  || align=right | 3.7 km || 
|-id=829 bgcolor=#d6d6d6
| 586829 ||  || — || May 22, 2003 || Kitt Peak || Spacewatch || Tj (2.99) || align=right | 3.0 km || 
|-id=830 bgcolor=#E9E9E9
| 586830 ||  || — || October 6, 2008 || Kitt Peak || Spacewatch ||  || align=right data-sort-value="0.81" | 810 m || 
|-id=831 bgcolor=#E9E9E9
| 586831 ||  || — || September 24, 2017 || Haleakala || Pan-STARRS ||  || align=right | 1.4 km || 
|-id=832 bgcolor=#E9E9E9
| 586832 ||  || — || September 23, 2008 || Mount Lemmon || Mount Lemmon Survey ||  || align=right | 1.7 km || 
|-id=833 bgcolor=#d6d6d6
| 586833 ||  || — || January 23, 2018 || Mount Lemmon || Mount Lemmon Survey ||  || align=right | 2.3 km || 
|-id=834 bgcolor=#d6d6d6
| 586834 ||  || — || November 4, 2004 || Kitt Peak || Spacewatch ||  || align=right | 2.1 km || 
|-id=835 bgcolor=#E9E9E9
| 586835 ||  || — || September 30, 2008 || Mount Lemmon || Mount Lemmon Survey ||  || align=right | 1.6 km || 
|-id=836 bgcolor=#E9E9E9
| 586836 ||  || — || December 2, 2004 || Palomar || NEAT ||  || align=right | 2.0 km || 
|-id=837 bgcolor=#E9E9E9
| 586837 ||  || — || December 2, 2004 || Palomar || NEAT ||  || align=right | 1.6 km || 
|-id=838 bgcolor=#fefefe
| 586838 ||  || — || February 7, 2002 || Palomar || NEAT ||  || align=right | 1.0 km || 
|-id=839 bgcolor=#E9E9E9
| 586839 ||  || — || December 10, 2004 || Kitt Peak || Spacewatch ||  || align=right | 1.2 km || 
|-id=840 bgcolor=#E9E9E9
| 586840 ||  || — || December 8, 2004 || Socorro || LINEAR ||  || align=right | 1.6 km || 
|-id=841 bgcolor=#E9E9E9
| 586841 ||  || — || December 14, 2004 || Catalina || CSS ||  || align=right | 1.5 km || 
|-id=842 bgcolor=#E9E9E9
| 586842 ||  || — || December 12, 2004 || Kitt Peak || Spacewatch ||  || align=right | 1.8 km || 
|-id=843 bgcolor=#E9E9E9
| 586843 ||  || — || December 14, 2004 || Catalina || CSS ||  || align=right | 1.4 km || 
|-id=844 bgcolor=#E9E9E9
| 586844 ||  || — || December 15, 2004 || Kitt Peak || Spacewatch ||  || align=right | 1.8 km || 
|-id=845 bgcolor=#d6d6d6
| 586845 ||  || — || December 2, 2004 || Catalina || CSS ||  || align=right | 2.9 km || 
|-id=846 bgcolor=#E9E9E9
| 586846 ||  || — || February 16, 2010 || Mount Lemmon || Mount Lemmon Survey ||  || align=right | 1.5 km || 
|-id=847 bgcolor=#fefefe
| 586847 ||  || — || December 31, 2011 || Kitt Peak || Spacewatch ||  || align=right data-sort-value="0.79" | 790 m || 
|-id=848 bgcolor=#E9E9E9
| 586848 ||  || — || October 8, 2008 || Mount Lemmon || Mount Lemmon Survey ||  || align=right | 1.2 km || 
|-id=849 bgcolor=#fefefe
| 586849 ||  || — || December 22, 2008 || Kitt Peak || Spacewatch ||  || align=right data-sort-value="0.74" | 740 m || 
|-id=850 bgcolor=#E9E9E9
| 586850 ||  || — || March 25, 2015 || Mount Lemmon || Mount Lemmon Survey ||  || align=right | 1.5 km || 
|-id=851 bgcolor=#fefefe
| 586851 ||  || — || October 12, 2007 || Mount Lemmon || Mount Lemmon Survey ||  || align=right data-sort-value="0.70" | 700 m || 
|-id=852 bgcolor=#d6d6d6
| 586852 ||  || — || September 28, 2009 || Mount Lemmon || Mount Lemmon Survey || 7:4 || align=right | 3.2 km || 
|-id=853 bgcolor=#fefefe
| 586853 ||  || — || December 19, 2004 || Mount Lemmon || Mount Lemmon Survey ||  || align=right data-sort-value="0.53" | 530 m || 
|-id=854 bgcolor=#fefefe
| 586854 ||  || — || January 7, 2005 || Catalina || CSS ||  || align=right | 1.4 km || 
|-id=855 bgcolor=#E9E9E9
| 586855 ||  || — || January 13, 2005 || Catalina || CSS ||  || align=right | 1.2 km || 
|-id=856 bgcolor=#fefefe
| 586856 ||  || — || January 13, 2005 || Socorro || LINEAR ||  || align=right data-sort-value="0.80" | 800 m || 
|-id=857 bgcolor=#E9E9E9
| 586857 ||  || — || January 15, 2005 || Kitt Peak || Spacewatch ||  || align=right | 1.4 km || 
|-id=858 bgcolor=#E9E9E9
| 586858 ||  || — || January 15, 2005 || Kitt Peak || Spacewatch ||  || align=right | 1.1 km || 
|-id=859 bgcolor=#fefefe
| 586859 ||  || — || January 13, 2005 || Kitt Peak || Spacewatch ||  || align=right data-sort-value="0.72" | 720 m || 
|-id=860 bgcolor=#E9E9E9
| 586860 ||  || — || January 7, 2005 || Campo Imperatore || A. Boattini, A. Di Paola ||  || align=right | 1.7 km || 
|-id=861 bgcolor=#E9E9E9
| 586861 ||  || — || January 19, 2005 || Kitt Peak || Spacewatch ||  || align=right | 1.7 km || 
|-id=862 bgcolor=#E9E9E9
| 586862 ||  || — || January 16, 2005 || Mauna Kea || Mauna Kea Obs. ||  || align=right | 1.3 km || 
|-id=863 bgcolor=#E9E9E9
| 586863 ||  || — || January 15, 2005 || Kitt Peak || Spacewatch ||  || align=right | 2.2 km || 
|-id=864 bgcolor=#E9E9E9
| 586864 ||  || — || January 16, 2005 || Mauna Kea || Mauna Kea Obs. ||  || align=right | 1.6 km || 
|-id=865 bgcolor=#fefefe
| 586865 ||  || — || January 16, 2005 || Mauna Kea || Mauna Kea Obs. ||  || align=right data-sort-value="0.52" | 520 m || 
|-id=866 bgcolor=#d6d6d6
| 586866 ||  || — || January 16, 2005 || Kitt Peak || Spacewatch ||  || align=right | 3.1 km || 
|-id=867 bgcolor=#E9E9E9
| 586867 ||  || — || January 16, 2005 || Mauna Kea || Mauna Kea Obs. ||  || align=right | 1.5 km || 
|-id=868 bgcolor=#E9E9E9
| 586868 ||  || — || October 1, 2008 || Mount Lemmon || Mount Lemmon Survey ||  || align=right | 1.3 km || 
|-id=869 bgcolor=#fefefe
| 586869 ||  || — || December 24, 2011 || Mount Lemmon || Mount Lemmon Survey ||  || align=right data-sort-value="0.69" | 690 m || 
|-id=870 bgcolor=#E9E9E9
| 586870 ||  || — || August 26, 2012 || Haleakala || Pan-STARRS ||  || align=right | 1.4 km || 
|-id=871 bgcolor=#E9E9E9
| 586871 ||  || — || December 18, 2004 || Mount Lemmon || Mount Lemmon Survey ||  || align=right | 1.7 km || 
|-id=872 bgcolor=#E9E9E9
| 586872 ||  || — || March 28, 2015 || Kitt Peak || Spacewatch ||  || align=right | 2.0 km || 
|-id=873 bgcolor=#E9E9E9
| 586873 ||  || — || March 28, 2015 || Haleakala || Pan-STARRS ||  || align=right | 2.3 km || 
|-id=874 bgcolor=#d6d6d6
| 586874 ||  || — || January 19, 2005 || Kitt Peak || Spacewatch ||  || align=right | 2.6 km || 
|-id=875 bgcolor=#fefefe
| 586875 ||  || — || February 1, 2005 || Kitt Peak || Spacewatch ||  || align=right data-sort-value="0.81" | 810 m || 
|-id=876 bgcolor=#fefefe
| 586876 ||  || — || February 1, 2005 || Kitt Peak || Spacewatch ||  || align=right data-sort-value="0.89" | 890 m || 
|-id=877 bgcolor=#fefefe
| 586877 ||  || — || February 1, 2005 || Kitt Peak || Spacewatch ||  || align=right data-sort-value="0.60" | 600 m || 
|-id=878 bgcolor=#E9E9E9
| 586878 ||  || — || February 9, 2005 || La Silla || A. Boattini ||  || align=right | 1.0 km || 
|-id=879 bgcolor=#E9E9E9
| 586879 ||  || — || February 2, 2005 || Catalina || CSS ||  || align=right | 3.1 km || 
|-id=880 bgcolor=#E9E9E9
| 586880 ||  || — || February 1, 2005 || Kitt Peak || Spacewatch ||  || align=right | 2.6 km || 
|-id=881 bgcolor=#E9E9E9
| 586881 ||  || — || December 31, 2008 || Mount Lemmon || Mount Lemmon Survey ||  || align=right | 1.3 km || 
|-id=882 bgcolor=#E9E9E9
| 586882 ||  || — || February 9, 2005 || Kitt Peak || Spacewatch ||  || align=right | 1.6 km || 
|-id=883 bgcolor=#fefefe
| 586883 ||  || — || June 5, 2013 || Mount Lemmon || Mount Lemmon Survey ||  || align=right data-sort-value="0.65" | 650 m || 
|-id=884 bgcolor=#fefefe
| 586884 ||  || — || January 13, 2016 || Haleakala || Pan-STARRS ||  || align=right data-sort-value="0.72" | 720 m || 
|-id=885 bgcolor=#E9E9E9
| 586885 ||  || — || March 18, 2010 || Mount Lemmon || Mount Lemmon Survey ||  || align=right | 1.6 km || 
|-id=886 bgcolor=#E9E9E9
| 586886 ||  || — || December 1, 2008 || Mount Lemmon || Mount Lemmon Survey ||  || align=right | 2.0 km || 
|-id=887 bgcolor=#fefefe
| 586887 ||  || — || February 1, 2005 || Kitt Peak || Spacewatch ||  || align=right data-sort-value="0.73" | 730 m || 
|-id=888 bgcolor=#E9E9E9
| 586888 ||  || — || September 13, 2007 || Mount Lemmon || Mount Lemmon Survey ||  || align=right | 1.5 km || 
|-id=889 bgcolor=#C2FFFF
| 586889 ||  || — || January 16, 2013 || Mount Lemmon || Mount Lemmon Survey || L4 || align=right | 6.6 km || 
|-id=890 bgcolor=#fefefe
| 586890 ||  || — || March 1, 2005 || Kitt Peak || Spacewatch ||  || align=right data-sort-value="0.61" | 610 m || 
|-id=891 bgcolor=#fefefe
| 586891 ||  || — || March 4, 2005 || Kitt Peak || Spacewatch ||  || align=right data-sort-value="0.74" | 740 m || 
|-id=892 bgcolor=#d6d6d6
| 586892 ||  || — || April 2, 2011 || Kitt Peak || Spacewatch ||  || align=right | 2.1 km || 
|-id=893 bgcolor=#fefefe
| 586893 ||  || — || March 4, 2005 || Mount Lemmon || Mount Lemmon Survey ||  || align=right data-sort-value="0.66" | 660 m || 
|-id=894 bgcolor=#E9E9E9
| 586894 ||  || — || May 23, 2001 || Cerro Tololo || J. L. Elliot, L. H. Wasserman ||  || align=right | 1.5 km || 
|-id=895 bgcolor=#d6d6d6
| 586895 ||  || — || March 10, 2005 || Kitt Peak || Spacewatch ||  || align=right | 2.5 km || 
|-id=896 bgcolor=#fefefe
| 586896 ||  || — || March 11, 2005 || Kitt Peak || Spacewatch ||  || align=right data-sort-value="0.85" | 850 m || 
|-id=897 bgcolor=#fefefe
| 586897 ||  || — || February 2, 2005 || Palomar || NEAT ||  || align=right | 1.3 km || 
|-id=898 bgcolor=#fefefe
| 586898 ||  || — || March 8, 2005 || Mount Lemmon || Mount Lemmon Survey ||  || align=right data-sort-value="0.77" | 770 m || 
|-id=899 bgcolor=#E9E9E9
| 586899 ||  || — || March 9, 2005 || Kitt Peak || Spacewatch ||  || align=right | 2.0 km || 
|-id=900 bgcolor=#E9E9E9
| 586900 ||  || — || March 11, 2005 || Mount Lemmon || Mount Lemmon Survey ||  || align=right | 1.00 km || 
|}

586901–587000 

|-bgcolor=#fefefe
| 586901 ||  || — || March 11, 2005 || Mount Lemmon || Mount Lemmon Survey ||  || align=right data-sort-value="0.92" | 920 m || 
|-id=902 bgcolor=#E9E9E9
| 586902 ||  || — || March 4, 2005 || Mount Lemmon || Mount Lemmon Survey ||  || align=right | 2.0 km || 
|-id=903 bgcolor=#fefefe
| 586903 ||  || — || March 9, 2005 || Mount Lemmon || Mount Lemmon Survey ||  || align=right data-sort-value="0.57" | 570 m || 
|-id=904 bgcolor=#fefefe
| 586904 ||  || — || February 28, 2009 || Kitt Peak || Spacewatch ||  || align=right data-sort-value="0.66" | 660 m || 
|-id=905 bgcolor=#fefefe
| 586905 ||  || — || February 9, 2005 || Kitt Peak || Spacewatch ||  || align=right data-sort-value="0.63" | 630 m || 
|-id=906 bgcolor=#E9E9E9
| 586906 ||  || — || March 11, 2005 || Kitt Peak || Spacewatch ||  || align=right | 2.1 km || 
|-id=907 bgcolor=#fefefe
| 586907 ||  || — || March 11, 2005 || Kitt Peak || Spacewatch ||  || align=right data-sort-value="0.66" | 660 m || 
|-id=908 bgcolor=#E9E9E9
| 586908 ||  || — || March 12, 2005 || Kitt Peak || Spacewatch ||  || align=right | 2.4 km || 
|-id=909 bgcolor=#fefefe
| 586909 ||  || — || March 11, 2005 || Mount Lemmon || Mount Lemmon Survey ||  || align=right data-sort-value="0.91" | 910 m || 
|-id=910 bgcolor=#E9E9E9
| 586910 ||  || — || March 8, 2005 || Mount Lemmon || Mount Lemmon Survey ||  || align=right | 1.6 km || 
|-id=911 bgcolor=#E9E9E9
| 586911 ||  || — || March 11, 2005 || Mount Lemmon || Mount Lemmon Survey ||  || align=right | 1.5 km || 
|-id=912 bgcolor=#fefefe
| 586912 ||  || — || March 17, 2005 || Kitt Peak || Spacewatch || MAS || align=right data-sort-value="0.71" | 710 m || 
|-id=913 bgcolor=#d6d6d6
| 586913 ||  || — || March 12, 2005 || Kitt Peak || M. W. Buie, L. H. Wasserman ||  || align=right | 1.5 km || 
|-id=914 bgcolor=#fefefe
| 586914 ||  || — || January 19, 2005 || Kitt Peak || Spacewatch ||  || align=right data-sort-value="0.73" | 730 m || 
|-id=915 bgcolor=#fefefe
| 586915 ||  || — || March 11, 2005 || Mount Lemmon || Mount Lemmon Survey ||  || align=right data-sort-value="0.54" | 540 m || 
|-id=916 bgcolor=#fefefe
| 586916 ||  || — || March 8, 2005 || Mount Lemmon || Mount Lemmon Survey ||  || align=right data-sort-value="0.66" | 660 m || 
|-id=917 bgcolor=#fefefe
| 586917 ||  || — || May 30, 2009 || Mount Lemmon || Mount Lemmon Survey ||  || align=right data-sort-value="0.69" | 690 m || 
|-id=918 bgcolor=#fefefe
| 586918 ||  || — || March 3, 2005 || Catalina || CSS ||  || align=right data-sort-value="0.72" | 720 m || 
|-id=919 bgcolor=#E9E9E9
| 586919 ||  || — || September 15, 1998 || Kitt Peak || Spacewatch ||  || align=right data-sort-value="0.79" | 790 m || 
|-id=920 bgcolor=#E9E9E9
| 586920 ||  || — || October 15, 2012 || Haleakala || Pan-STARRS ||  || align=right | 1.7 km || 
|-id=921 bgcolor=#fefefe
| 586921 ||  || — || August 27, 2006 || Kitt Peak || Spacewatch ||  || align=right data-sort-value="0.64" | 640 m || 
|-id=922 bgcolor=#d6d6d6
| 586922 ||  || — || January 23, 2015 || Haleakala || Pan-STARRS ||  || align=right | 1.7 km || 
|-id=923 bgcolor=#fefefe
| 586923 ||  || — || December 19, 2007 || Kitt Peak || Spacewatch ||  || align=right data-sort-value="0.71" | 710 m || 
|-id=924 bgcolor=#fefefe
| 586924 ||  || — || March 3, 2005 || Kitt Peak || Spacewatch ||  || align=right data-sort-value="0.72" | 720 m || 
|-id=925 bgcolor=#E9E9E9
| 586925 ||  || — || November 6, 2012 || Mount Lemmon || Mount Lemmon Survey ||  || align=right | 1.9 km || 
|-id=926 bgcolor=#fefefe
| 586926 ||  || — || March 4, 2005 || Mount Lemmon || Mount Lemmon Survey ||  || align=right data-sort-value="0.54" | 540 m || 
|-id=927 bgcolor=#fefefe
| 586927 ||  || — || March 11, 2005 || Kitt Peak || Spacewatch ||  || align=right data-sort-value="0.55" | 550 m || 
|-id=928 bgcolor=#fefefe
| 586928 ||  || — || March 17, 2005 || Kitt Peak || Spacewatch ||  || align=right data-sort-value="0.76" | 760 m || 
|-id=929 bgcolor=#fefefe
| 586929 ||  || — || May 1, 2009 || Mount Lemmon || Mount Lemmon Survey ||  || align=right data-sort-value="0.68" | 680 m || 
|-id=930 bgcolor=#d6d6d6
| 586930 ||  || — || March 17, 2005 || Kitt Peak || Spacewatch ||  || align=right | 2.3 km || 
|-id=931 bgcolor=#fefefe
| 586931 ||  || — || April 2, 2005 || Mount Lemmon || Mount Lemmon Survey ||  || align=right data-sort-value="0.72" | 720 m || 
|-id=932 bgcolor=#fefefe
| 586932 ||  || — || April 5, 2005 || Mount Lemmon || Mount Lemmon Survey ||  || align=right data-sort-value="0.55" | 550 m || 
|-id=933 bgcolor=#fefefe
| 586933 ||  || — || March 17, 2005 || Kitt Peak || Spacewatch ||  || align=right data-sort-value="0.65" | 650 m || 
|-id=934 bgcolor=#fefefe
| 586934 ||  || — || April 5, 2005 || Palomar || NEAT || H || align=right data-sort-value="0.63" | 630 m || 
|-id=935 bgcolor=#fefefe
| 586935 ||  || — || March 17, 2005 || Kitt Peak || Spacewatch ||  || align=right data-sort-value="0.79" | 790 m || 
|-id=936 bgcolor=#fefefe
| 586936 ||  || — || April 5, 2005 || Mount Lemmon || Mount Lemmon Survey ||  || align=right data-sort-value="0.55" | 550 m || 
|-id=937 bgcolor=#fefefe
| 586937 ||  || — || April 9, 2005 || Mount Lemmon || Mount Lemmon Survey || H || align=right data-sort-value="0.45" | 450 m || 
|-id=938 bgcolor=#fefefe
| 586938 ||  || — || April 11, 2005 || Kitt Peak || Spacewatch || H || align=right data-sort-value="0.59" | 590 m || 
|-id=939 bgcolor=#fefefe
| 586939 ||  || — || April 11, 2005 || Mount Lemmon || Mount Lemmon Survey ||  || align=right data-sort-value="0.69" | 690 m || 
|-id=940 bgcolor=#fefefe
| 586940 ||  || — || April 14, 2005 || Kitt Peak || Spacewatch ||  || align=right data-sort-value="0.60" | 600 m || 
|-id=941 bgcolor=#fefefe
| 586941 ||  || — || April 14, 2005 || Kitt Peak || Spacewatch ||  || align=right data-sort-value="0.74" | 740 m || 
|-id=942 bgcolor=#E9E9E9
| 586942 ||  || — || February 9, 2005 || Kitt Peak || Spacewatch ||  || align=right | 1.8 km || 
|-id=943 bgcolor=#fefefe
| 586943 ||  || — || March 16, 2005 || Mount Lemmon || Mount Lemmon Survey ||  || align=right data-sort-value="0.64" | 640 m || 
|-id=944 bgcolor=#fefefe
| 586944 ||  || — || March 13, 2005 || Kitt Peak || Spacewatch ||  || align=right data-sort-value="0.62" | 620 m || 
|-id=945 bgcolor=#fefefe
| 586945 ||  || — || April 10, 2005 || Kitt Peak || Kitt Peak Obs. ||  || align=right data-sort-value="0.48" | 480 m || 
|-id=946 bgcolor=#fefefe
| 586946 ||  || — || April 2, 2005 || Mount Lemmon || Mount Lemmon Survey ||  || align=right data-sort-value="0.60" | 600 m || 
|-id=947 bgcolor=#E9E9E9
| 586947 ||  || — || April 4, 2005 || Mount Lemmon || Mount Lemmon Survey ||  || align=right | 1.8 km || 
|-id=948 bgcolor=#E9E9E9
| 586948 ||  || — || April 10, 2005 || Mount Lemmon || Mount Lemmon Survey ||  || align=right | 1.1 km || 
|-id=949 bgcolor=#d6d6d6
| 586949 ||  || — || November 8, 2016 || Haleakala || Pan-STARRS || 7:4 || align=right | 3.0 km || 
|-id=950 bgcolor=#fefefe
| 586950 ||  || — || April 27, 2009 || Mount Lemmon || Mount Lemmon Survey ||  || align=right data-sort-value="0.71" | 710 m || 
|-id=951 bgcolor=#E9E9E9
| 586951 ||  || — || February 26, 2014 || Haleakala || Pan-STARRS ||  || align=right | 2.1 km || 
|-id=952 bgcolor=#fefefe
| 586952 ||  || — || November 14, 2007 || Kitt Peak || Spacewatch ||  || align=right data-sort-value="0.59" | 590 m || 
|-id=953 bgcolor=#fefefe
| 586953 ||  || — || April 6, 2005 || Mount Lemmon || Mount Lemmon Survey ||  || align=right data-sort-value="0.69" | 690 m || 
|-id=954 bgcolor=#fefefe
| 586954 ||  || — || April 16, 2005 || Kitt Peak || Spacewatch ||  || align=right data-sort-value="0.55" | 550 m || 
|-id=955 bgcolor=#fefefe
| 586955 ||  || — || April 7, 2005 || Kitt Peak || Spacewatch ||  || align=right data-sort-value="0.64" | 640 m || 
|-id=956 bgcolor=#fefefe
| 586956 ||  || — || May 4, 2005 || Mount Lemmon || Mount Lemmon Survey ||  || align=right data-sort-value="0.58" | 580 m || 
|-id=957 bgcolor=#fefefe
| 586957 ||  || — || May 7, 2005 || Mount Lemmon || Mount Lemmon Survey ||  || align=right data-sort-value="0.63" | 630 m || 
|-id=958 bgcolor=#E9E9E9
| 586958 ||  || — || May 10, 2005 || Kitt Peak || Spacewatch ||  || align=right | 1.6 km || 
|-id=959 bgcolor=#E9E9E9
| 586959 ||  || — || May 10, 2005 || Cerro Tololo || M. W. Buie, L. H. Wasserman ||  || align=right | 1.8 km || 
|-id=960 bgcolor=#C2FFFF
| 586960 ||  || — || May 10, 2005 || Cerro Tololo || M. W. Buie, L. H. Wasserman || L4 || align=right | 5.4 km || 
|-id=961 bgcolor=#E9E9E9
| 586961 ||  || — || May 10, 2005 || Kitt Peak || Spacewatch ||  || align=right | 2.2 km || 
|-id=962 bgcolor=#fefefe
| 586962 ||  || — || April 2, 1994 || Kitt Peak || Spacewatch ||  || align=right data-sort-value="0.79" | 790 m || 
|-id=963 bgcolor=#d6d6d6
| 586963 ||  || — || April 4, 2005 || Mount Lemmon || Mount Lemmon Survey ||  || align=right | 2.3 km || 
|-id=964 bgcolor=#fefefe
| 586964 ||  || — || April 18, 2009 || Mount Lemmon || Mount Lemmon Survey ||  || align=right data-sort-value="0.67" | 670 m || 
|-id=965 bgcolor=#d6d6d6
| 586965 ||  || — || May 11, 2005 || Kitt Peak || Spacewatch ||  || align=right | 2.0 km || 
|-id=966 bgcolor=#fefefe
| 586966 ||  || — || April 27, 2009 || Mount Lemmon || Mount Lemmon Survey ||  || align=right data-sort-value="0.76" | 760 m || 
|-id=967 bgcolor=#fefefe
| 586967 ||  || — || May 29, 2005 || Siding Spring || SSS ||  || align=right data-sort-value="0.84" | 840 m || 
|-id=968 bgcolor=#fefefe
| 586968 ||  || — || May 20, 2005 || Mount Lemmon || Mount Lemmon Survey ||  || align=right data-sort-value="0.60" | 600 m || 
|-id=969 bgcolor=#d6d6d6
| 586969 ||  || — || June 1, 2005 || Mount Lemmon || Mount Lemmon Survey ||  || align=right | 2.6 km || 
|-id=970 bgcolor=#d6d6d6
| 586970 ||  || — || June 3, 2005 || Kitt Peak || Spacewatch ||  || align=right | 1.9 km || 
|-id=971 bgcolor=#d6d6d6
| 586971 ||  || — || June 4, 2005 || Kitt Peak || Spacewatch ||  || align=right | 3.0 km || 
|-id=972 bgcolor=#fefefe
| 586972 ||  || — || June 30, 2005 || Kitt Peak || Spacewatch ||  || align=right data-sort-value="0.68" | 680 m || 
|-id=973 bgcolor=#d6d6d6
| 586973 ||  || — || June 30, 2005 || Kitt Peak || Spacewatch ||  || align=right | 2.5 km || 
|-id=974 bgcolor=#d6d6d6
| 586974 ||  || — || October 20, 2011 || Mount Lemmon || Mount Lemmon Survey ||  || align=right | 2.4 km || 
|-id=975 bgcolor=#d6d6d6
| 586975 ||  || — || July 5, 2005 || Mount Lemmon || Mount Lemmon Survey ||  || align=right | 2.1 km || 
|-id=976 bgcolor=#d6d6d6
| 586976 ||  || — || July 4, 2005 || Mount Lemmon || Mount Lemmon Survey ||  || align=right | 1.9 km || 
|-id=977 bgcolor=#fefefe
| 586977 ||  || — || June 30, 2005 || Kitt Peak || Spacewatch ||  || align=right | 1.1 km || 
|-id=978 bgcolor=#d6d6d6
| 586978 ||  || — || July 5, 2005 || Mount Lemmon || Mount Lemmon Survey ||  || align=right | 2.2 km || 
|-id=979 bgcolor=#fefefe
| 586979 ||  || — || July 5, 2005 || Kitt Peak || Spacewatch ||  || align=right | 1.00 km || 
|-id=980 bgcolor=#fefefe
| 586980 ||  || — || July 7, 2005 || Mauna Kea || Mauna Kea Obs. ||  || align=right data-sort-value="0.60" | 600 m || 
|-id=981 bgcolor=#d6d6d6
| 586981 ||  || — || July 7, 2005 || Mauna Kea || Mauna Kea Obs. ||  || align=right | 1.8 km || 
|-id=982 bgcolor=#d6d6d6
| 586982 ||  || — || July 15, 2005 || Mount Lemmon || Mount Lemmon Survey ||  || align=right | 1.9 km || 
|-id=983 bgcolor=#d6d6d6
| 586983 ||  || — || June 17, 2005 || Mount Lemmon || Mount Lemmon Survey ||  || align=right | 2.7 km || 
|-id=984 bgcolor=#d6d6d6
| 586984 ||  || — || July 7, 2005 || Mauna Kea || Mauna Kea Obs. ||  || align=right | 1.9 km || 
|-id=985 bgcolor=#E9E9E9
| 586985 ||  || — || July 7, 2005 || Mauna Kea || Mauna Kea Obs. ||  || align=right | 2.0 km || 
|-id=986 bgcolor=#fefefe
| 586986 ||  || — || July 5, 2005 || Palomar || NEAT ||  || align=right data-sort-value="0.74" | 740 m || 
|-id=987 bgcolor=#d6d6d6
| 586987 ||  || — || January 16, 2008 || Kitt Peak || Spacewatch ||  || align=right | 2.5 km || 
|-id=988 bgcolor=#fefefe
| 586988 ||  || — || July 5, 2005 || Kitt Peak || Spacewatch ||  || align=right data-sort-value="0.45" | 450 m || 
|-id=989 bgcolor=#d6d6d6
| 586989 ||  || — || July 29, 2005 || Palomar || NEAT ||  || align=right | 2.8 km || 
|-id=990 bgcolor=#fefefe
| 586990 ||  || — || June 29, 2005 || Kitt Peak || Spacewatch || H || align=right data-sort-value="0.73" | 730 m || 
|-id=991 bgcolor=#d6d6d6
| 586991 ||  || — || July 30, 2005 || Campo Imperatore || A. Boattini ||  || align=right | 3.3 km || 
|-id=992 bgcolor=#d6d6d6
| 586992 ||  || — || December 23, 2012 || Haleakala || Pan-STARRS ||  || align=right | 2.5 km || 
|-id=993 bgcolor=#fefefe
| 586993 ||  || — || July 31, 2005 || Palomar || NEAT ||  || align=right data-sort-value="0.49" | 490 m || 
|-id=994 bgcolor=#fefefe
| 586994 ||  || — || August 4, 2005 || Palomar || NEAT ||  || align=right data-sort-value="0.68" | 680 m || 
|-id=995 bgcolor=#fefefe
| 586995 ||  || — || January 17, 2007 || Kitt Peak || Spacewatch ||  || align=right data-sort-value="0.73" | 730 m || 
|-id=996 bgcolor=#fefefe
| 586996 ||  || — || May 21, 2014 || Haleakala || Pan-STARRS ||  || align=right data-sort-value="0.44" | 440 m || 
|-id=997 bgcolor=#d6d6d6
| 586997 ||  || — || August 8, 2005 || Cerro Tololo || Cerro Tololo Obs. ||  || align=right | 2.5 km || 
|-id=998 bgcolor=#E9E9E9
| 586998 ||  || — || August 25, 2005 || Palomar || NEAT ||  || align=right | 1.9 km || 
|-id=999 bgcolor=#d6d6d6
| 586999 ||  || — || July 30, 2005 || Palomar || NEAT ||  || align=right | 2.4 km || 
|-id=000 bgcolor=#fefefe
| 587000 ||  || — || August 27, 2005 || Kitt Peak || Spacewatch || H || align=right data-sort-value="0.70" | 700 m || 
|}

References

External links 
 Discovery Circumstances: Numbered Minor Planets (585001)–(590000) (IAU Minor Planet Center)

0586